This is a list of the bird species recorded in Colombia. According to the South American Classification Committee (SACC) of the American Ornithological Society (AOS), the avifauna of Colombia has 1863 confirmed species. Of them, 84 are endemic, three have been introduced by humans, and 65 are rare or vagrants. One of the endemic species is believed to be extinct. An additional 37 species are hypothetical (see below).

The Colombian province of San Andrés and Providencia is much closer to Nicaragua than to the South American mainland, so the SACC does not address records there. A 2015 publication adds 17 species whose only Colombian records are from that province and also five species to the mainland list. Three of the 17 are also considered hypothetical. A 2020 publication adds four more species (one offshore sighting, two vagrants to the mainland, and one vagrant to San Andrés and Providencia). (The SACC does not address records from more than 200 miles offshore.) Another vagrant species whose published record has not been evaluated by the SACC is also included.

The total number of species presented here is 1925. Of them, 87 are endemic and 71 are vagrants.

Unless noted otherwise, the list's taxonomic treatment (designation and sequence of orders, families, and species) and nomenclature (common and scientific names) are also those of the SACC.

The following tags have been used to highlight several categories.

 (V) Vagrant - a species that rarely or accidentally occurs in Colombia
 (E) Endemic - a species endemic to Colombia
 (I) Introduced - a species introduced to Colombia as a consequence, direct or indirect, of human actions
 (H) Hypothetical - a species recorded but with "no tangible evidence" according to the SACC
 (SA) San Andrés - a species whose only Colombian records are from the province of San Andrés and Providencia

Population status symbols are those of the Red List published by the International Union for Conservation of Nature (IUCN). The symbols apply to the species' worldwide status, not their status solely in Colombia. The symbols and their meanings, in increasing order of peril, are:

 = Data deficient
 = Near threatened
 = Vulnerable
 = Endangered
 = Critically endangered
 = Extinct

Tinamous
Order: TinamiformesFamily: Tinamidae

The tinamous are one of the most ancient groups of bird. Although they look similar to other ground-dwelling birds like quail and grouse, they have no close relatives and are classified as a single family, Tinamidae, within their own order, the Tinamiformes. They are distantly related to the ratites (order Struthioniformes), that includes the rheas, emus, and kiwis. Seventeen species have been recorded in Colombia.

Tawny-breasted tinamou, Nothocercus julius
Highland tinamou, Nothocercus bonapartei
Gray tinamou, Tinamus tao 
Black tinamou, Tinamus osgoodi 
Great tinamou, Tinamus major 
White-throated tinamou, Tinamus guttatus 
Berlepsch's tinamou, Crypturellus berlepschi
Cinereous tinamou, Crypturellus cinereus
Little tinamou, Crypturellus soui
Brown tinamou, Crypturellus obsoletus
Undulated tinamou, Crypturellus undulatus
Gray-legged tinamou, Crypturellus duidae 
Red-legged tinamou, Crypturellus erythropus
Choco tinamou, Crypturellus kerriae 
Variegated tinamou, Crypturellus variegatus
Rusty tinamou, Crypturellus brevirostris (H)
Barred tinamou, Crypturellus casiquiare

Screamers
Order: AnseriformesFamily: Anhimidae

The screamers are a small family of birds related to the ducks. They are large, bulky birds, with a small downy head, long legs, and large feet which are only partially webbed. They have large spurs on their wings which are used in fights over mates and in territorial disputes. Two species have been recorded in Colombia.

Horned screamer, Anhima cornuta
Northern screamer, Chauna chavaria

Ducks
Order: AnseriformesFamily: Anatidae

Anatidae includes the ducks and most duck-like waterfowl, such as geese and swans. These birds are adapted to an aquatic existence with webbed feet, flattened bills, and feathers that are excellent at shedding water due to an oily coating. Twenty-five species have been recorded in Colombia.

Fulvous whistling-duck, Dendrocygna bicolor
White-faced whistling-duck, Dendrocygna viduata
Black-bellied whistling-duck, Dendrocygna autumnalis
Orinoco goose, Oressochen jubata 
Muscovy duck, Cairina moschata
Comb duck, Sarkidiornis sylvicola
Brazilian teal, Amazonetta brasiliensis
Torrent duck, Merganetta armata
Puna teal, Spatula puna (H)
Northern shoveler, Spatula clypeata
Blue-winged teal, Spatula discors
Cinnamon teal, Spatula cyanoptera
Gadwall, Mareca strepera (SA)
American wigeon, Mareca americana
White-cheeked pintail, Anas bahamensis
Northern pintail, Anas acuta
Yellow-billed pintail, Anas georgica
Green-winged teal, Anas crecca (V)
Andean teal, Anas andium
Southern pochard, Netta erythrophthalma
Ring-necked duck, Aythya collaris (V)
Lesser scaup, Aythya affinis
Masked duck, Nomonyx dominicus
Ruddy duck, Oxyura jamaicensis
Red-breasted merganser, Mergus serrator (SA)

Guans
Order: GalliformesFamily: Cracidae

The Cracidae are large birds, similar in general appearance to turkeys. The guans and curassows live in trees, but the smaller chachalacas are found in more open scrubby habitats. They are generally dull-plumaged, but the curassows and some guans have colorful facial ornaments. Colombia has the largest number of cracids of any country; twenty-six have been recorded there.

Sickle-winged guan, Chamaepetes goudotii
Band-tailed guan, Penelope argyrotis
Baudo guan, Penelope ortoni 
Andean guan, Penelope montagnii
Spix's guan, Penelope jacquacu
Crested guan, Penelope purpurascens
Cauca guan, Penelope perspicax (E) 
Blue-throated piping-guan, Pipile cumanensis
Wattled guan, Aburria aburri
Gray-headed chachalaca, Ortalis cinereiceps
Chestnut-winged chachalaca, Ortalis garrula (E)
Rufous-vented chachalaca, Ortalis ruficauda
Rufous-headed chachalaca, Ortalis erythroptera 
Colombian chachalaca, Ortalis columbiana (E)
Speckled chachalaca, Ortalis guttata
 Variable chachalaca, Ortalis motmot (H)
Nocturnal curassow, Nothocrax urumutum
Great curassow, Crax rubra 
Blue-billed curassow, Crax alberti (E) 
Yellow-knobbed curassow, Crax daubentoni 
Black curassow, Crax alector 
Wattled curassow, Crax globulosa 
Crestless curassow, Mitu tomentosa 
Salvin's curassow, Mitu salvini
Razor-billed curassow, Mitu tuberosa
Helmeted curassow, Pauxi pauxi

New World quails
Order: GalliformesFamily: Odontophoridae

The New World quails are small, plump terrestrial birds only distantly related to the quails of the Old World, but named for their similar appearance and habits. Ten species have been recorded in Colombia.

Tawny-faced quail, Rhynchortyx cinctus
Crested bobwhite, Colinus cristatus
Marbled wood-quail, Odontophorus gujanensis 
Black-fronted wood-quail, Odontophorus atrifrons 
Rufous-fronted wood-quail, Odontophorus erythrops
Chestnut wood-quail, Odontophorus hyperythrus (E) 
Dark-backed wood-quail, Odontophorus melanonotus 
Rufous-breasted wood-quail, Odontophorus speciosus 
Tacarcuna wood-quail, Odontophorus dialeucos 
Gorgeted wood-quail, Odontophorus strophium (E)

Flamingos
Order: PhoenicopteriformesFamily: Phoenicopteridae

Flamingos filter-feed on shellfish and algae. Their oddly shaped beaks are specially adapted to separate mud and silt from the food they consume and, uniquely, are used upside-down. One species has been recorded in Colombia.

American flamingo, Phoenicopterus ruber

Grebes
Order: PodicipediformesFamily: Podicipedidae

Grebes are small to medium-large freshwater diving birds. They have lobed toes and are excellent swimmers and divers. However, they have their feet placed far back on the body, making them quite ungainly on land. Four species have been recorded in Colombia.

Least grebe, Tachybaptus dominicus
Pied-billed grebe, Podilymbus podiceps
Colombian grebe, Podiceps andinus (E) 
Silvery grebe, Podiceps occipitalis

Pigeons
Order: ColumbiformesFamily: Columbidae

Pigeons and doves are stout-bodied birds with short necks and short slender bills with a fleshy cere. Thirty-eight species have been recorded in Colombia.

Rock pigeon, Columba livia (I)
White-crowned pigeon, Patagioenas leucocephala 
Scaled pigeon, Patagioenas speciosa
Bare-eyed pigeon, Patagioenas corensis
Band-tailed pigeon, Patagioenas fasciata
Pale-vented pigeon, Patagioenas cayennensis
Plumbeous pigeon, Patagioenas plumbea
Ruddy pigeon, Patagioenas subvinacea 
Short-billed pigeon, Patagioenas nigrirostris
Dusky pigeon, Patagioenas goodsoni
Purple quail-dove, Geotrygon purpurata 
Sapphire quail-dove, Geotrygon saphirina
Ruddy quail-dove, Geotrygon montana
Violaceous quail-dove, Geotrygon violacea
Olive-backed quail-dove, Leptotrygon veraguensis
White-tipped dove, Leptotila verreauxi
Caribbean dove, Lepotila jamaicensis (SA)
Gray-chested dove, Leptotila cassinii
Tolima dove, Leptotila conoveri (E) 
Gray-headed dove, Leptotila plumbeiceps
Gray-fronted dove, Leptotila rufaxilla
Pallid dove, Leptotila pallida
White-throated quail-dove, Zentrygon frenata
Lined quail-dove, Zentrygon linearis
Russet-crowned quail-dove, Zentrygon goldmani 
White-winged dove, Zenaida asiatica (V)
Eared dove, Zenaida auriculata
Mourning dove, Zenaida macroura (V)
Blue ground dove, Claravis pretiosa
Maroon-chested ground dove, Paraclaravis mondetoura
Black-winged ground dove, Metriopelia melanoptera
Common ground dove, Columbina passerina
Plain-breasted ground dove, Columbina minuta
Ruddy ground dove, Columbina talpacoti
Ecuadorian ground dove, Columbina buckleyi
Scaled dove, Columbina squammata
Picui ground dove, Columbina picui
Croaking ground dove, Columbina cruziana

Cuckoos
Order: CuculiformesFamily: Cuculidae

The family Cuculidae includes cuckoos, roadrunners, and anis. These birds are of variable size with slender bodies, long tails and strong legs. Twenty-one species have been recorded in Colombia.

Greater ani, Crotophaga major
Smooth-billed ani, Crotophaga ani
Groove-billed ani, Crotophaga sulcirostris
Striped cuckoo, Tapera naevia
Pheasant cuckoo, Dromococcyx phasianellus
Pavonine cuckoo, Dromococcyx pavoninus
Rufous-vented ground-cuckoo, Neomorphus geoffroyi 
Banded ground-cuckoo, Neomorphus radiolosus  
Rufous-winged ground-cuckoo, Neomorphus rufipennis (H)
Red-billed ground-cuckoo, Neomorphus pucheranii
Little cuckoo, Coccycua minuta
Dwarf cuckoo, Coccycua pumilus
Ash-colored cuckoo, Coccycua cinereus (H)
Squirrel cuckoo, Piaya cayana
Black-bellied cuckoo, Piaya melanogaster
Dark-billed cuckoo, Coccyzus melacoryphus
Yellow-billed cuckoo, Coccyzus americanus
Pearly-breasted cuckoo, Coccyzus euleri (V)
Mangrove cuckoo, Coccyzus minor (V)
Black-billed cuckoo, Coccyzus erythropthalmus
Gray-capped cuckoo, Coccyzus lansbergi

Oilbird
Order: SteatornithiformesFamily: Steatornithidae

The oilbird is a slim, long-winged bird related to the nightjars. It is nocturnal and a specialist feeder on the fruit of the oil palm.

Oilbird, Steatornis caripensis

Potoos
Order: NyctibiiformesFamily: Nyctibiidae

The potoos (sometimes called poor-me-ones) are large near passerine birds related to the nightjars and frogmouths. They are nocturnal insectivores which lack the bristles around the mouth found in the true nightjars. Five species have been recorded in Colombia.

Rufous potoo, Phyllaemulor bracteatus
Great potoo, Nyctibius grandis
Long-tailed potoo, Nyctibius aethereus
Common potoo, Nyctibius griseus
Andean potoo, Nyctibius maculosus

Nightjars
Order: CaprimulgiformesFamily: Caprimulgidae

Nightjars are medium-sized nocturnal birds that usually nest on the ground. They have long wings, short legs, and very short bills. Most have small feet, of little use for walking, and long pointed wings. Their soft plumage is camouflaged to resemble bark or leaves. Twenty-one species have been recorded in Colombia.

Nacunda nighthawk, Chordeiles nacunda
Least nighthawk, Chordeiles pusillus
Sand-colored nighthawk, Chordeiles rupestris
Lesser nighthawk, Chordeiles acutipennis
Common nighthawk, Chordeiles minor
Short-tailed nighthawk, Lurocalis semitorquatus
Rufous-bellied nighthawk, Lurocalis rufiventris
Band-tailed nighthawk, Nyctiprogne leucopyga
Blackish nightjar, Nyctipolus nigrescens
Band-winged nightjar, Systellura longirostris
Common pauraque, Nyctidromus albicollis
Swallow-tailed nightjar, Uropsalis segmentata
Lyre-tailed nightjar, Uropsalis lyra
Todd's nightjar, Setopagis heterura
White-tailed nightjar, Hydropsalis cayennensis
Spot-tailed nightjar, Hydropsalis maculicaudus
Ladder-tailed nightjar, Hydropsalis climacocerca
Choco poorwill, Nyctiphrynus rosenbergi 
Ocellated poorwill, Nyctiphrynus ocellatus
Chuck-will's-widow, Antrostomus carolinensis 
Rufous nightjar, Antrostomus rufus

Swifts
Order: ApodiformesFamily: Apodidae

Swifts are small birds which spend the majority of their lives flying. These birds have very short legs and never settle voluntarily on the ground, perching instead only on vertical surfaces. Many swifts have long swept-back wings which resemble a crescent or boomerang. Seventeen species have been recorded in Colombia.

Spot-fronted swift, Cypseloides cherriei 
White-chinned swift, Cypseloides cryptus
Black swift, Cypseloides niger
White-chested swift, Cypseloides lemosi
Chestnut-collared swift, Streptoprocne rutila
White-collared swift, Streptoprocne zonaris
Gray-rumped swift, Chaetura cinereiventris
Band-rumped swift, Chaetura spinicaudus
Pale-rumped swift, Chaetura egregia (V)
Chimney swift, Chaetura pelagica (V) 
Chapman's swift, Chaetura chapmani
Sick's swift, Chaetura meridionalis
Short-tailed swift, Chaetura brachyura
White-tipped swift, Aeronautes montivagus
Pygmy palm swift, Tachornis furcata
Fork-tailed palm swift, Tachornis squamata
Lesser swallow-tailed swift, Panyptila cayennensis

Hummingbirds
Order: ApodiformesFamily: Trochilidae

Hummingbirds are small birds capable of hovering in mid-air due to the rapid flapping of their wings. They are the only birds that can fly backwards. Colombia has the greatest diversity of hummingbirds of any country on earth. One hundred sixty-eight species have been recorded there.

Fiery topaz, Topaza pyra
White-necked jacobin, Florisuga mellivora
White-tipped sicklebill, Eutoxeres aquila
Buff-tailed sicklebill, Eutoxeres condamini
Bronzy hermit, Glaucis aeneus
Rufous-breasted hermit, Glaucis hirsutus
Band-tailed barbthroat, Threnetes ruckeri
Pale-tailed barbthroat, Threnetes leucurus
Streak-throated hermit, Phaethornis rupurumii
Black-throated hermit, Phaethornis atrimentalis
Stripe-throated hermit, Phaethornis striigularis
Gray-chinned hermit, Phaethornis griseogularis
Reddish hermit, Phaethornis ruber
Sooty-capped hermit, Phaethornis augusti
Pale-bellied hermit, Phaethornis anthophilus
White-bearded hermit, Phaethornis hispidus
White-whiskered hermit, Phaethornis yaruqui
Green hermit, Phaethornis guy
Tawny-bellied hermit, Phaethornis syrmatophorus
Straight-billed hermit, Phaethornis bourcieri
Long-billed hermit, Phaethornis longirostris
Great-billed hermit, Phaethornis malaris
Green-fronted lancebill, Doryfera ludovicae
Blue-fronted lancebill, Doryfera johannae
White-throated daggerbill, Schistes albogularis
Geoffroy's daggerbill, Schistes geoffroyi
Brown violetear, Colibri delphinae
Lesser violetear, Colibri cyanotus
Sparkling violetear, Colibri coruscans
Tooth-billed hummingbird, Androdon aequatorialis
Purple-crowned fairy, Heliothryx barroti
Black-eared fairy, Heliothryx auritus
White-tailed goldenthroat, Polytmus guainumbi
Green-tailed goldenthroat, Polytmus theresiae
Fiery-tailed awlbill, Avocettula recurvirostris (V)
Ruby-topaz hummingbird, Chrysolampis mosquitus
Green-breasted mango, Anthracothorax prevostii
Black-throated mango, Anthracothorax nigricollis
Orange-throated sunangel, Heliangelus mavors
Amethyst-throated sunangel, Heliangelus amethysticollis
Gorgeted sunangel, Heliangelus strophianus
Tourmaline sunangel, Heliangelus exortis
Bogota sunangel, Heliangelus zusii (E)
Green thorntail, Discosura conversii
Wire-crested thorntail, Discosura popelairii 
Black-bellied thorntail, Discosura langsdorffi
Racket-tailed thorntail, Discosura longicaudus
Rufous-crested coquette, Lophornis delattrei
Spangled coquette, Lophornis stictolophus
Butterfly coquette, Lophornis verreauxii
Ecuadorian piedtail, Phlogophilus hemileucurus 
Speckled hummingbird, Adelomyia melanogenys
Long-tailed sylph, Aglaiocercus kingii
Violet-tailed sylph, Aglaiocercus coelestis
Ecuadorian hillstar, Oreotrochilus chimborazo
Mountain avocetbill, Opisthoprora euryptera
Black-tailed trainbearer, Lesbia victoriae
Green-tailed trainbearer, Lesbia nuna
Black-backed thornbill, Ramphomicron dorsale (E) 
Purple-backed thornbill, Ramphomicron microrhynchum
Buffy helmetcrest, Oxypogon stubelii (E) 
Blue-bearded helmetcrest, Oxypogon cyanolaemus (E) 
Green-bearded helmetcrest, Oxypogon guerinii (E)
Rufous-capped thornbill, Chalcostigma ruficeps (V)
Blue-mantled thornbill, Chalcostigma stanleyi
Bronze-tailed thornbill, Chalcostigma heteropogon
Rainbow-bearded thornbill, Chalcostigma herrani
Tyrian metaltail, Metallura tyrianthina
Perija metaltail, Metallura iracunda 
Viridian metaltail, Metallura williami
Greenish puffleg, Haplophaedia aureliae
Hoary puffleg, Haplophaedia lugens 
Gorgeted puffleg, Eriocnemis isabellae (E) 
Glowing puffleg, Eriocnemis vestita
Black-thighed puffleg, Eriocnemis derbyi 
Turquoise-throated puffleg, Eriocnemis godini
Coppery-bellied puffleg, Eriocnemis cupreoventris 
Sapphire-vented puffleg, Eriocnemis luciani
Golden-breasted puffleg, Eriocnemis mosquera
Colorful puffleg, Eriocnemis mirabilis (E) 
Emerald-bellied puffleg, Eriocnemis aline
Shining sunbeam, Aglaeactis cupripennis
Bronzy inca, Coeligena coeligena
Brown inca, Coeligena wilsoni
Black inca, Coeligena prunellei (E) 
Collared inca, Coeligena torquata
White-tailed starfrontlet, Coeligena phalerata (E) 
Dusky starfrontlet, Coeligena orina (E) 
Perija starfrontlet, Coeligena consita (see note) 
Buff-winged starfrontlet, Coeligena lutetiae
Golden-bellied starfrontlet, Coeligena bonapartei
Blue-throated starfrontlet, Coeligena helianthea
Mountain velvetbreast, Lafresnaya lafresnayi
Sword-billed hummingbird, Ensifera ensifera
Great sapphirewing, Pterophanes cyanopterus
Buff-tailed coronet, Boissonneaua flavescens
Chestnut-breasted coronet, Boissonneaua matthewsii
Velvet-purple coronet, Boissonneaua jardini
Booted racket-tail, Ocreatus underwoodii
Rufous-gaped hillstar, Urochroa bougueri 
Green-backed hillstar, Urochroa leucura
Purple-bibbed whitetip, Urosticte benjamini
Rufous-vented whitetip, Urosticte ruficrissa
Pink-throated brilliant, Heliodoxa gularis  
Black-throated brilliant, Heliodoxa schreibersii
Gould's jewelfront, Heliodoxa aurescens
Fawn-breasted brilliant, Heliodoxa rubinoides
Green-crowned brilliant, Heliodoxa jacula
Empress brilliant, Heliodoxa imperatrix
Violet-fronted brilliant, Heliodoxa leadbeateri
Giant hummingbird, Patagona gigas
Violet-chested hummingbird, Sternoclyta cyanopectus
Long-billed starthroat, Heliomaster longirostris
Blue-tufted starthroat, Heliomaster furcifer
White-bellied woodstar, Chaetocercus mulsant
Little woodstar, Chaetocercus bombus (H) 
Gorgeted woodstar, Chaetocercus heliodor
Santa Marta woodstar, Chaetocercus astreans (E)
Rufous-shafted woodstar, Chaetocercus jourdanii
Amethyst woodstar, Calliphlox amethystina
Purple-throated woodstar, Philodice mitchellii
Ruby-throated hummingbird, Archilochus colubris (SA) (H)
Western emerald, Chlorostilbon melanorhynchus
Red-billed emerald, Chlorostilbon gibsoni
Blue-tailed emerald, Chlorostilbon mellisugus
Chiribiquete emerald, Chlorostilbon olivaresi (E)
Coppery emerald, Chlorostilbon russatus
Narrow-tailed emerald, Chlorostilbon stenurus
Short-tailed emerald, Chlorostilbon poortmani
Blue-chinned sapphire, Chlorestes notata
Violet-headed hummingbird, Klais guimeti
Santa Marta blossomcrown, Anthocephala floriceps (E) 
Tolima blossomcrown, Anthocephala berlepschi (E) 
Gray-breasted sabrewing, Campylopterus largipennis
Lazuline sabrewing, Campylopterus falcatus
Santa Marta sabrewing, Campylopterus phainopeplus (E) 
Napo sabrewing, Campylopterus villaviscensio  
White-vented plumeleteer, Chalybura buffonii
Bronze-tailed plumeleteer, Chalybura urochrysia
Crowned woodnymph, Thalurania colombica
Fork-tailed woodnymph, Thalurania furcata
Pirre hummingbird, Goldmania bella  
Violet-capped hummingbird, Goldmania violiceps
Scaly-breasted hummingbird, Phaeochroa cuvierii
Buffy hummingbird, Leucippus fallax
Many-spotted hummingbird, Taphrospilus hypostictus
Olive-spotted hummingbird, Talaphorus chlorocercus
Chestnut-bellied hummingbird, Saucerottia castaneiventris (E) 
Steely-vented hummingbird, Saucerottia saucerottei
Indigo-capped hummingbird, Saucerottia cyanifrons (E)
Snowy-bellied hummingbird, Saucerottia edward
Green-bellied hummingbird, Saucerottia viridigaster
Rufous-tailed hummingbird, Amazilia tzacatl
Andean emerald, Uranomitra franciae
Versicolored emerald, Chrysuronia versicolor
Shining-green hummingbird, Chrysuronia goudoti
Golden-tailed sapphire, Chrysuronia oenone
Sapphire-throated hummingbird, Chrysuronia coeruleogularis
Sapphire-bellied hummingbird, Chrysuronia lilliae (E) 
Humboldt's sapphire, Chrysuronia humboldtii
Blue-headed sapphire, Chrysuronia grayi
Glittering-throated emerald, Chionomesa fimbriata
Rufous-throated sapphire, Hylocharis sapphirina
Blue-chested hummingbird, Polyerata amabilis
Purple-chested hummingbird, Polyerata rosenbergi
Blue-throated goldentail, Chlorestes eliciae
White-chinned sapphire, Chlorestes cyanus
Violet-bellied hummingbird, Chlorestes julie

Hoatzin
Order: OpisthocomiformesFamily: Opisthocomidae

The hoatzin is pheasant-sized, but much slimmer. It has a long tail and neck, but a small head with an unfeathered blue face and red eyes which are topped by a spiky crest. It is a weak flier which is found in the swamps of the Amazon and Orinoco rivers.

Hoatzin, Opisthocomus hoazin

Limpkin
Order: GruiformesFamily: Aramidae

The limpkin resembles a large rail. It has drab-brown plumage and a grayer head and neck.

Limpkin, Aramus guarauna

Trumpeters
Order: GruiformesFamily: Psophiidae

The trumpeters are dumpy birds with long necks and legs and chicken-like bills. They are named for the trumpeting call of the males. One species has been recorded in Colombia.

Gray-winged trumpeter, Psophia crepitans

Rails
Order: GruiformesFamily: Rallidae

Rallidae is a large family of small to medium-sized birds which includes the rails, crakes, coots, and gallinules. Typically they inhabit dense vegetation in damp environments near lakes, swamps, or rivers. In general they are shy and secretive birds, making them difficult to observe. Most species have strong legs and long toes which are well adapted to soft uneven surfaces. They tend to have short, rounded wings and to be weak fliers. Twenty-nine species have been recorded in Colombia.

Mangrove rail, Rallus longirostris
Virginia rail, Rallus limicola
Bogota rail, Rallus semiplumbeus 
Purple gallinule, Porphyrio martinica
Azure gallinule, Porphyrio flavirostris
Chestnut-headed crake, Anurolimnas castaneiceps
Russet-crowned crake, Anurolimnas viridis
Black-banded crake, Anurolimnas fasciatus
Rufous-sided crake, Laterallus melanophaius
White-throated crake, Laterallus albigularis
Gray-breasted crake, Laterallus exilis
Black rail, Laterallus jamaicensis (V)
Speckled rail, Coturnicops notatus (V)
Ocellated crake, Micropygia schomburgkii
Ash-throated crake, Mustelirallus albicollis
Colombian crake, Mustelirallus colombianus 
Paint-billed crake, Mustelirallus erythrops
Spotted rail, Pardirallus maculatus
Blackish rail, Pardirallus nigricans
Uniform crake, Amaurolimnas concolor
Brown wood-rail, Aramides wolfi 
Gray-cowled wood-rail, Aramides cajaneus
Rufous-necked wood-rail, Aramides axillaris
Spot-flanked gallinule, Porphyriops melanops
Yellow-breasted crake, Porzana flaviventer
Sora, Porzana carolina
Common gallinule, Gallinula galeata
American coot, Fulica americana
Slate-colored coot, Fulica ardesiaca

Finfoots
Order: GruiformesFamily: Heliornithidae

Heliornithidae is a small family of tropical birds with webbed lobes on their feet similar to those of grebes and coots. One species has been recorded in Colombia.

Sungrebe, Heliornis fulica

Plovers
Order: CharadriiformesFamily: Charadriidae

The family Charadriidae includes the plovers, dotterels, and lapwings. They are small to medium-sized birds with compact bodies, short, thick necks and long, usually pointed, wings. They are found in open country worldwide, mostly in habitats near water. Ten species have been recorded in Colombia.

American golden-plover, Pluvialis dominica
Black-bellied plover, Pluvialis squatarola
Pied lapwing, Vanellus cayanus
Southern lapwing, Vanellus chilensis
Andean lapwing, Vanellus resplendens
Killdeer, Charadrius vociferus
Semipalmated plover, Charadrius semipalmatus
Wilson's plover, Charadrius wilsonia
Collared plover, Charadrius collaris
Snowy plover, Charadrius nivosus

Oystercatchers
Order: CharadriiformesFamily: Haematopodidae

The oystercatchers are large and noisy plover-like birds, with strong bills used for smashing or prising open molluscs. One species has been recorded in Colombia.

American oystercatcher, Haematopus palliatus

Avocets and stilts
Order: CharadriiformesFamily: Recurvirostridae

Recurvirostridae is a family of large wading birds, which includes the avocets and stilts. The avocets have long legs and long up-curved bills. The stilts have extremely long legs and long, thin, straight bills. Two species have been recorded in Colombia.

Black-necked stilt, Himantopus mexicanus
American avocet, Recurvirostra americana (V)

Thick-knees
Order: CharadriiformesFamily: Burhinidae

The thick-knees are a group of waders found worldwide within the tropical zone, with some species also breeding in temperate Europe and Australia. They are medium to large waders with strong black or yellow-black bills, large yellow eyes, and cryptic plumage. Despite being classed as waders, most species have a preference for arid or semi-arid habitats. One species has been recorded in Colombia.

Double-striped thick-knee, Burhinus bistriatus

Sandpipers
Order: CharadriiformesFamily: Scolopacidae

Scolopacidae is a large diverse family of small to medium-sized shorebirds including the sandpipers, curlews, godwits, shanks, tattlers, woodcocks, snipes, dowitchers, and phalaropes. The majority of these species eat small invertebrates picked out of the mud or soil. Variation in length of legs and bills enables multiple species to feed in the same habitat, particularly on the coast, without direct competition for food. Thirty-six species have been recorded in Colombia.

Upland sandpiper, Bartramia longicauda
Whimbrel, Numenius phaeopus
Long-billed curlew, Numenius americanus (H)
Hudsonian godwit, Limosa haemastica
Marbled godwit, Limosa fedoa
Ruddy turnstone, Arenaria interpres
Red knot, Calidris canutus 
Surfbird, Calidris virgata
Ruff, Calidris pugnax (V)
Stilt sandpiper, Calidris himantopus
Sanderling, Calidris alba
Dunlin, Calidris alpina
Baird's sandpiper, Calidris bairdii
Least sandpiper, Calidris minutilla
White-rumped sandpiper, Calidris fuscicollis
Buff-breasted sandpiper, Calidris subruficollis 
Pectoral sandpiper, Calidris melanotos
Semipalmated sandpiper, Calidris pusilla 
Western sandpiper, Calidris mauri
Short-billed dowitcher, Limnodromus griseus
Long-billed dowitcher, Limnodromus scolopaceus
Imperial snipe, Gallinago imperialis 
Jameson's snipe, Gallinago jamesoni
Noble snipe, Gallinago nobilis 
Giant snipe, Gallinago undulata (V)
Wilson's snipe, Gallinago delicata
Pantanal snipe, Gallinago paraguaiae
Wilson's phalarope, Phalaropus tricolor
Red-necked phalarope, Phalaropus lobatus
Red phalarope, Phalaropus fulicarius (V)
Spotted sandpiper, Actitis macularia
Solitary sandpiper, Tringa solitaria
Wandering tattler, Tringa incana
Greater yellowlegs, Tringa melanoleuca
Willet, Tringa semipalmata
Lesser yellowlegs, Tringa flavipes

Jacanas
Order: CharadriiformesFamily: Jacanidae

The jacanas are a family of waders found throughout the tropics. They are identifiable by their huge feet and claws which enable them to walk on floating vegetation in the shallow lakes that are their preferred habitat. One species has been recorded in Colombia.

Wattled jacana, Jacana jacana

Skuas
Order: CharadriiformesFamily: Stercorariidae

The family Stercorariidae are, in general, medium to large birds, typically with gray or brown plumage, often with white markings on the wings. They nest on the ground in temperate and arctic regions and are long-distance migrants. Five species have been recorded in Colombia.

Great skua, Stercorarius skua (H)
South polar skua, Stercorarius maccormicki (H)
Pomarine jaeger, Stercorarius pomarinus
Parasitic jaeger, Stercorarius parasiticus
Long-tailed jaeger, Stercorarius longicaudus

Skimmers
Order: CharadriiformesFamily: Rynchopidae

Skimmers are a small family of tropical tern-like birds. They have an elongated lower mandible which they use to feed by flying low over the water surface and skimming the water for small fish. One species has been recorded in Colombia.

Black skimmer, Rynchops niger

Gulls
Order: CharadriiformesFamily: Laridae

Laridae is a family of medium to large seabirds and includesgulls, terns, and skimmers. Gulls are typically gray or white, often with black markings on the head or wings. They have webbed feet. Terns are a group of generally medium to large seabirds typically with gray or white plumage, often with black markings on the head. Most terns hunt fish by diving but some pick insects off the surface of fresh water. Terns are generally long-lived birds, with several species known to live in excess of 30 years. Thirty-four species of Laridae have been recorded in Colombia.

Swallow-tailed gull, Creagrus furcatus
Sabine's gull, Xema sabini
Andean gull, Chroicocephalus serranus
Gray-hooded gull, Chroicocephalus cirrocephalus (V)
Black-headed gull, Chroicocephalus ridibundus (H)
Little gull, Hydrocoloeus minutus (V)
Gray gull, Leucophaeus modestus (V)
Laughing gull, Leucophaeus atricilla
Franklin's gull, Leucophaeus pipixcan
Ring-billed gull, Larus delawarensis (V)
Great black-backed gull, Larus marinus (H)
Kelp gull, Larus dominicanus (V)
Lesser black-backed gull, Larus fuscus (V)
Herring gull, Larus argentatus (V)
Brown noddy, Anous stolidus
Black noddy, Anous minutus 
White tern, Gygis alba
Sooty tern, Onychoprion fuscatus (V)
Bridled tern, Onychoprion anaethetus
Least tern, Sternula antillarum
Yellow-billed tern, Sternula superciliaris
Large-billed tern, Phaetusa simplex
Gull-billed tern, Gelochelidon nilotica
Caspian tern, Hydroprogne caspia
Inca tern, Larosterna inca (H) 
Black tern, Chlidonias niger
Common tern, Sterna hirundo
Roseate tern, Sterna dougallii (H)
Arctic tern, Sterna paradisaea (V)
South American tern, Sterna hirundinacea (H)
Forster's tern, Sterna forsteri (V)
Elegant tern, Thalasseus elegans 
Sandwich tern, Thalasseus sandwichensis
Royal tern, Thalasseus maximus

Sunbittern
Order: EurypygiformesFamily: Eurypygidae

The sunbittern is a bittern-like bird of tropical regions of the Americas and the sole member of the family Eurypygidae (sometimes spelled Eurypigidae) and genus Eurypyga.

Sunbittern, Eurypyga helias

Tropicbirds
Order: PhaethontiformesFamily: Phaethontidae

Tropicbirds are slender white birds of tropical oceans, with exceptionally long central tail feathers. Their heads and long wings have black markings. Three species have been recorded in Colombia.

Red-billed tropicbird, Phaethon aethereus
Red-tailed tropicbird, Phaethon rubricauda (H)
White-tailed tropicbird, Phaethon lepturus (H)

Penguins
Order: SphenisciformesFamily: Spheniscidae

The penguins are a group of aquatic, flightless birds living almost exclusively in the Southern Hemisphere. Most penguins feed on krill, fish, squid, and other forms of sealife caught while swimming underwater. Three species have been recorded in Colombia.
 
Humboldt penguin, Spheniscus humboldti  (V)
Galapagos penguin, Spheniscus mendiculus  (H)
Magellanic penguin, Spheniscus magellanicus (V)

Albatrosses
Order: ProcellariiformesFamily: Diomedeidae

The albatrosses are among the largest of flying birds, and the great albatrosses from the genus Diomedea have the largest wingspans of any extant birds. Two species have been recorded in Colombia.

Waved albatross, Phoebastria irrorata (V) 
Black-browed albatross, Thalassarche melanophris (V)

Southern storm-petrels
Order: ProcellariiformesFamily: Oceanitidae

The storm-petrels are the smallest seabirds, relatives of the petrels, feeding on planktonic crustaceans and small fish picked from the surface, typically while hovering. The flight is fluttering and sometimes bat-like. Until 2018, this family's species were included with the other storm-petrels in family Hydrobatidae. Two species have been recorded in Colombia.

White-bellied storm-petrel, Fregetta grallaria (H)
Elliot's storm-petrel, Oceanites gracilis

Northern storm-petrels
Order: ProcellariiformesFamily: Hydrobatidae

Though the members of this family are similar in many respects to the southern storm-petrels, including their general appearance and habits, there are enough genetic differences to warrant their placement in a separate family. Seven species have been recorded in Colombia.

Least storm-petrel, Hydrobates microsoma (V)
Wedge-rumped storm-petrel, Hydrobates tethys
Band-rumped storm-petrel, Hydrobates castro (H)
Leach's storm-petrel, Hydrobates leucorhoa (V)
Markham's storm-petrel, Hydrobates markhami (H) 
Hornby's storm-petrel, Hydrobates hornbyi (V)
Black storm-petrel, Hydrobates melania

Shearwaters
Order: ProcellariiformesFamily: Procellariidae

The procellariids are the main group of medium-sized "true petrels", characterized by united nostrils with medium septum and a long outer functional primary. Fifteen species have been recorded in Colombia.

Cape petrel, Daption capense (V)
Black-capped petrel, Pterodroma hasitata (V)
Galapagos petrel, Pterodroma phaeopygia (V) 
Juan Fernandez petrel, Pterodroma externa (H)
White-chinned petrel, Procellaria aequinoctialis (H)
Parkinson's petrel, Procellaria parkinsoni (V) 
Westland petrel, Procellaria westlandica (V)
Cory's shearwater, Calonectris diomedea (V)
Wedge-tailed shearwater, Ardenna pacifica (V)
Sooty shearwater, Ardenna grisea
Pink-footed shearwater, Ardenna creatopa (V) 
Manx shearwater, Puffinus puffinus (H)
Christmas shearwater, Puffinus nativitatis (V)
Galapagos shearwater, Puffinus subalaris (V)
Audubon's shearwater, Puffinus lherminieri

Storks
Order: CiconiiformesFamily: Ciconiidae

Storks are large, long-legged, long-necked wading birds with long, stout bills. Storks are mute, but bill-clattering is an important mode of communication at the nest. Their nests can be large and may be reused for many years. Many species are migratory. Three species have been recorded in Colombia.

Maguari stork, Ciconia maguari
Jabiru, Jabiru mycteria
Wood stork, Mycteria americana

Frigatebirds
Order: SuliformesFamily: Fregatidae

Frigatebirds are large seabirds usually found over tropical oceans. They are large, black-and-white, or completely black, with long wings and deeply forked tails. The males have colored inflatable throat pouches. They do not swim or walk and cannot take off from a flat surface. Having the largest wingspan-to-body-weight ratio of any bird, they are essentially aerial, able to stay aloft for more than a week. Two species have been recorded in Colombia.

Magnificent frigatebird, Fregata magnificens
Great frigatebird, Fregata minor

Boobies
Order: SuliformesFamily: Sulidae

The sulids comprise the gannets and boobies. Both groups are medium to large coastal seabirds that plunge-dive for fish. Six species have been recorded in Colombia.

Blue-footed booby, Sula nebouxii
Peruvian booby, Sula variegata (V)
Masked booby, Sula dactylatra
Nazca booby, Sula granti
Red-footed booby, Sula sula
Brown booby, Sula leucogaster

Anhingas
Order: SuliformesFamily: Anhingidae

Anhingas are often called "snake-birds" because of their long thin neck, which gives a snake-like appearance when they swim with their bodies submerged. The males have black and dark-brown plumage, an erectile crest on the nape, and a larger bill than the female. The females have much paler plumage especially on the neck and underparts. The anhingas have completely webbed feet and their legs are short and set far back on the body. Their plumage is somewhat permeable, like that of cormorants, and they spread their wings to dry after diving. One species has been recorded in Colombia.

Anhinga, Anhinga anhinga

Cormorants
Order: SuliformesFamily: Phalacrocoracidae

Phalacrocoracidae is a family of medium to large coastal, fish-eating seabirds that includes cormorants and shags. Plumage coloration varies, with the majority having mainly dark plumage, some species being black-and-white, and a few being colorful. Three species have been recorded in Colombia.

Neotropic cormorant, Phalacrocorax brasilianus
Guanay cormorant, Phalacrocorax bougainvillii (V)
Double-crested cormorant, Phalacrocorax auritus (SA)

Pelicans
Order: PelecaniformesFamily: Pelecanidae

Pelicans are large water birds with a distinctive pouch under their beak. As with other members of the order Pelecaniformes, they have webbed feet with four toes. Two species have been recorded in Colombia.

American white pelican, Pelecanus erythrorhynchos (SA)
Brown pelican, Pelecanus occidentalis

Herons
Order: PelecaniformesFamily: Ardeidae

The family Ardeidae contains the bitterns, herons, and egrets. Herons and egrets are medium to large wading birds with long necks and legs. Bitterns tend to be shorter necked and more wary. Members of Ardeidae fly with their necks retracted, unlike other long-necked birds such as storks, ibises, and spoonbills. Twenty-three species have been recorded in Colombia.

Rufescent tiger-heron, Tigrisoma lineatum
Fasciated tiger-heron, Tigrisoma fasciatum
Bare-throated tiger-heron, Tigrisoma mexicanum
Agami heron, Agamia agami 
Boat-billed heron, Cochlearius cochlearius
Zigzag heron, Zebrilus undulatus 
Pinnated bittern, Botaurus pinnatus
Least bittern, Ixobrychus exilis
Stripe-backed bittern, Ixobrychus involucris
Black-crowned night-heron, Nycticorax nycticorax
Yellow-crowned night-heron, Nyctanassa violacea
Green heron, Butorides virescens
Striated heron, Butorides striata
Cattle egret, Bubulcus ibis
Great blue heron, Ardea herodias
Cocoi heron, Ardea cocoi
Great egret, Ardea alba
Whistling heron, Syrigma sibilatrix
Capped heron, Pilherodius pileatus
Tricolored heron, Egretta tricolor
Reddish egret, Egretta rufescens 
Snowy egret, Egretta thula
Little blue heron, Egretta caerulea

Ibises
Order: PelecaniformesFamily: Threskiornithidae

Threskiornithidae is a family of large terrestrial and wading birds which includes the ibises and spoonbills. They have long, broad wings with 11 primary and about 20 secondary feathers. They are strong fliers and despite their size and weight, very capable soarers. Eight species have been recorded in Colombia.

White ibis, Eudocimus albus
Scarlet ibis, Eudocimus ruber
Glossy ibis, Plegadis falcinellus (V)
Sharp-tailed ibis, Cercibis oxycerca
Green ibis, Mesembrinibis cayennensis
Bare-faced ibis, Phimosus infuscatus
Buff-necked ibis, Theristicus caudatus
Roseate spoonbill, Platalea ajaja

New World vultures
Order: CathartiformesFamily: Cathartidae

The New World vultures are not closely related to Old World vultures, but superficially resemble them because of convergent evolution. Like the Old World vultures, they are scavengers. However, unlike Old World vultures, which find carcasses by sight, New World vultures have a good sense of smell with which they locate carrion. Six species have been recorded in Colombia.

King vulture, Sarcoramphus papa
Andean condor, Vultur gryphus 
Black vulture, Coragyps atratus
Turkey vulture, Cathartes aura
Lesser yellow-headed vulture, Cathartes burrovianus
Greater yellow-headed vulture, Cathartes melambrotus

Osprey
Order: AccipitriformesFamily: Pandionidae

The family Pandionidae contains only one species, the osprey. The osprey is a medium-large raptor which is a specialist fish-eater with a worldwide distribution.

Osprey, Pandion haliaetus

Hawks
Order: AccipitriformesFamily: Accipitridae

Accipitridae is a family of birds of prey, which includes hawks, eagles, kites, harriers, and Old World vultures. These birds have powerful hooked beaks for tearing flesh from their prey, strong legs, powerful talons, and keen eyesight. Fifty species have been recorded in Colombia.

Pearl kite, Gampsonyx swainsonii
White-tailed kite, Elanus leucurus
Hook-billed kite, Chondrohierax uncinatus
Gray-headed kite, Leptodon cayanensis
Swallow-tailed kite, Elanoides forficatus
Crested eagle, Morphnus guianensis 
Harpy eagle, Harpia harpyja 
Black hawk-eagle, Spizaetus tyrannus
Black-and-white hawk-eagle, Spizaetus melanoleucus
Ornate hawk-eagle, Spizaetus ornatus 
Black-and-chestnut eagle, Spizaetus isidori 
Black-collared hawk, Busarellus nigricollis
Snail kite, Rostrhamus sociabilis
Slender-billed kite, Helicolestes hamatus
Double-toothed kite, Harpagus bidentatus
Mississippi kite, Ictinia mississippiensis
Plumbeous kite, Ictinia plumbea
Northern harrier, Circus hudsonius
Cinereous harrier, Circus cinereus
Long-winged harrier, Circus buffoni
Gray-bellied hawk, Accipiter poliogaster 
Sharp-shinned hawk, Accipiter striatus
Cooper's hawk, Accipiter cooperii
Bicolored hawk, Accipiter bicolor
Tiny hawk, Microspizias superciliosus
Semicollared hawk, Microspizias collaris 
Crane hawk, Geranospiza caerulescens
Plumbeous hawk, Cryptoleucopteryx plumbea 
Slate-colored hawk, Buteogallus schistaceus
Common black hawk, Buteogallus anthracinus
Savanna hawk, Buteogallus meridionalis
Great black hawk, Buteogallus urubitinga
Solitary eagle, Buteogallus solitarius 
Barred hawk, Morphnarchus princeps
Roadside hawk, Rupornis magnirostris
Harris's hawk, Parabuteo unicinctus
White-rumped hawk, Parabuteo leucorrhous
White-tailed hawk, Geranoaetus albicaudatus
Variable hawk, Geranoaetus polyosoma
Black-chested buzzard-eagle, Geranoaetus melanoleucus
White hawk, Pseudastur albicollis
Semiplumbeous hawk, Leucopternis semiplumbeus
Black-faced hawk, Leucopternis melanops
Gray-lined hawk, Buteo nitidus
Broad-winged hawk, Buteo platypterus
White-throated hawk, Buteo albigula
Short-tailed hawk, Buteo brachyurus
Swainson's hawk, Buteo swainsoni
Zone-tailed hawk, Buteo albonotatus
Red-tailed hawk, Buteo jamaicensis (V)

Barn owls
Order: StrigiformesFamily: Tytonidae

Barn owls are medium to large owls with large heads and characteristic heart-shaped faces. They have long strong legs with powerful talons. One species has been recorded in Colombia.

Barn owl, Tyto alba

Owls
Order: StrigiformesFamily: Strigidae

The typical owls are small to large solitary nocturnal birds of prey. They have large forward-facing eyes and ears, a hawk-like beak and a conspicuous circle of feathers around each eye called a facial disk. Twenty-seven species have been recorded in Colombia.

Bare-shanked screech-owl, Megascops clarkii
White-throated screech-owl, Megascops albogularis
Tropical screech-owl, Megascops choliba
Rufescent screech-owl, Megascops ingens 
Cinnamon screech-owl, Megascops petersoni
Choco screech-owl, Megascops centralis
Foothill screech-owl, Megascops roraimae
Santa Marta screech-owl, Megascops gilesi (E) 
Tawny-bellied screech-owl, Megascops watsonii
Crested owl, Lophostrix cristata
Spectacled owl, Pulsatrix perspicillata
Band-bellied owl, Pulsatrix melanota
Great horned owl, Bubo virginianus
Mottled owl, Strix virgata
Black-and-white owl, Strix nigrolineata
Black-banded owl, Strix huhula
Rufous-banded owl, Strix albitarsus
Cloud-forest pygmy-owl, Glaucidium nubicola 
Andean pygmy-owl, Glaucidium jardinii
Subtropical pygmy-owl, Glaucidium parkeri
Central American pygmy-owl, Glaucidium griseiceps
Ferruginous pygmy-owl, Glaucidium brasilianum
Burrowing owl, Athene cunicularia
Buff-fronted owl, Aegolius harrisii
Striped owl, Asio clamator
Stygian owl, Asio stygius
Short-eared owl, Asio flammeus

Trogons
Order: TrogoniformesFamily: Trogonidae

The family Trogonidae includes trogons and quetzals. Found in tropical woodlands worldwide, they feed on insects and fruit, and their broad bills and weak legs reflect their diet and arboreal habits. Although their flight is fast, they are reluctant to fly any distance. Trogons have soft, often colorful, feathers with distinctive male and female plumage. Fifteen species have been recorded in Colombia, the largest number in any country.

Pavonine quetzal, Pharomachrus pavoninus
Golden-headed quetzal, Pharomachrus auriceps
White-tipped quetzal, Pharomachrus fulgidus
Crested quetzal, Pharomachrus antisianus
Slaty-tailed trogon, Trogon massena
Blue-tailed trogon, Trogon comptus
Black-tailed trogon, Trogon melanurus
White-tailed trogon, Trogon chionurus
Green-backed trogon, Trogon viridis
Gartered trogon, Trogon caligatus
Amazonian trogon, Trogon ramonianus
Blue-crowned trogon, Trogon curucui
Black-throated trogon, Trogon rufus (see note)
Collared trogon, Trogon collaris
Masked trogon, Trogon personatus

Motmots
Order: CoraciiformesFamily: Momotidae

The motmots have colorful plumage and long, graduated tails which they display by waggling back and forth. In most of the species, the barbs near the ends of the two longest (central) tail feathers are weak and fall off, leaving a length of bare shaft and creating a racket-shaped tail. Six species have been recorded in Colombia.

Tody motmot, Hylomanes momotula
Broad-billed motmot, Electron platyrhynchum
Rufous motmot, Baryphthengus martii
Whooping motmot, Momotus subrufescens
Amazonian motmot, Momotus momota
Andean motmot, Momotus aequatorialis

Kingfishers
Order: CoraciiformesFamily: Alcedinidae

Kingfishers are medium-sized birds with large heads, long, pointed bills, short legs, and stubby tails. Six species have been recorded in Colombia.

Ringed kingfisher, Megaceryle torquatus
Belted kingfisher, Megaceryle alcyon
Amazon kingfisher, Chloroceryle amazona
American pygmy kingfisher, Chloroceryle aenea
Green kingfisher, Chloroceryle americana
Green-and-rufous kingfisher, Chloroceryle inda

Jacamars
Order: GalbuliformesFamily: Galbulidae

The jacamars are near passerine birds from tropical South America, with a range that extends up to Mexico. They feed on insects caught on the wing, and are glossy, elegant birds with long bills and tails. In appearance and behavior they resemble the Old World bee-eaters, although they are more closely related to puffbirds. Thirteen species have been recorded in Colombia.

White-eared jacamar, Galbalcyrhynchus leucotis
Brown jacamar, Brachygalba lugubris
Pale-headed jacamar, Brachygalba goeringi
Dusky-backed jacamar, Brachygalba salmoni
Yellow-billed jacamar, Galbula albirostris
Rufous-tailed jacamar, Galbula ruficauda
Green-tailed jacamar, Galbula galbula
White-chinned jacamar, Galbula tombacea
Coppery-chested jacamar, Galbula pastazae 
Purplish jacamar, Galbula chalcothorax
Bronzy jacamar, Galbula leucogastra
Paradise jacamar, Galbula dea
Great jacamar, Jacamerops aureus

Puffbirds
Order: GalbuliformesFamily: Bucconidae

The puffbirds are related to the jacamars and have the same range, but lack the iridescent colors of that family. They are mainly brown, rufous, or gray, with large heads and flattened bills with hooked tips. The loose abundant plumage and short tails makes them look stout and puffy, giving rise to the English common name of the family. Twenty-four species have been recorded in Colombia.

White-necked puffbird, Notharchus hyperrhynchus
Black-breasted puffbird, Notharchus pectoralis
Brown-banded puffbird, Notharchus ordii
Pied puffbird, Notharchus tectus
Chestnut-capped puffbird, Bucco macrodactylus
Spotted puffbird, Bucco tamatia
Sooty-capped puffbird, Bucco noanamae (E) 
Collared puffbird, Bucco capensis
Barred puffbird, Nystalus radiatus
Western striolated-puffbird, Nystalus obamai
Russet-throated puffbird, Hypnelus ruficollis
White-chested puffbird, Malacoptila fusca
White-whiskered puffbird, Malacoptila panamensis
Black-streaked puffbird, Malacoptila fulvogularis
Moustached puffbird, Malacoptila mystacalis
Lanceolated monklet, Micromonacha lanceolata
Rusty-breasted nunlet, Nonnula rubecula
Brown nunlet, Nonnula brunnea
Gray-cheeked nunlet, Nonnula frontalis
White-faced nunbird, Hapaloptila castanea
Black-fronted nunbird, Monasa nigrifrons
White-fronted nunbird, Monasa morphoeus
Yellow-billed nunbird, Monasa flavirostris
Swallow-winged puffbird, Chelidoptera tenebrosa

New World barbets
Order: PiciformesFamily: Capitonidae

The barbets are plump birds with short necks and large heads. They get their name from the bristles which fringe their heavy bills. Most species are brightly colored. Eight species have been recorded in Colombia.

Scarlet-crowned barbet, Capito aurovirens
Spot-crowned barbet, Capito maculicoronatus
Orange-fronted barbet, Capito squamatus 
White-mantled barbet, Capito hypoleucus (E) 
Five-colored barbet, Capito quinticolor 
Gilded barbet, Capito auratus
Lemon-throated barbet, Eubucco richardsoni
Red-headed barbet, Eubucco bourcierii

Toucan-barbets
Order: PiciformesFamily: Semnornithidae

The toucan-barbets are birds of montane forests in the Neotropics. They are highly social and non-migratory.

Toucan barbet, Semnornis ramphastinus

Toucans
Order: PiciformesFamily: Ramphastidae

Toucans are near passerine birds from the Neotropics. They are brightly marked and have enormous colorful bills which in some species amount to half their body length. Twenty species have been recorded in Colombia, the largest number of toucans of any country.

Yellow-throated toucan, Ramphastos ambiguus 
White-throated toucan, Ramphastos tucanus
Keel-billed toucan, Ramphastos sulfuratus
Choco toucan, Ramphastos brevis
Channel-billed toucan, Ramphastos vitellinus 
Southern emerald-toucanet, Aulacorhynchus albivitta
Groove-billed toucanet, Aulacorhynchus sulcatus
Chestnut-tipped toucanet, Aulacorhynchus derbianus
Crimson-rumped toucanet, Aulacorhynchus haematopygus
Gray-breasted mountain-toucan, Andigena hypoglauca 
Plate-billed mountain-toucan, Andigena laminirostris 
Black-billed mountain-toucan, Andigena nigrirostris
Yellow-eared toucanet, Selenidera spectabilis
Golden-collared toucanet, Selenidera reinwardtii
Tawny-tufted toucanet, Selenidera nattereri
Lettered aracari, Pteroglossus inscriptus
Collared aracari, Pteroglossus torquatus
Chestnut-eared aracari, Pteroglossus castanotis
Many-banded aracari, Pteroglossus pluricinctus
Ivory-billed aracari, Pteroglossus azara

Woodpeckers
Order: PiciformesFamily: Picidae

Woodpeckers are small to medium-sized birds with chisel-like beaks, short legs, stiff tails, and long tongues used for capturing insects. Some species have feet with two toes pointing forward and two backward, while several species have only three toes. Many woodpeckers have the habit of tapping noisily on tree trunks with their beaks. Forty-three species have been recorded in Colombia.

Bar-breasted piculet, Picumnus aurifrons
Orinoco piculet, Picumnus pumilus
Lafresnaye's piculet, Picumnus lafresnayi
Golden-spangled piculet, Picumnus exilis
Scaled piculet, Picumnus squamulatus
Rufous-breasted piculet, Picumnus rufiventris
Plain-breasted piculet, Picumnus castelnau
Olivaceous piculet, Picumnus olivaceus
Grayish piculet, Picumnus granadensis (E)
Chestnut piculet, Picumnus cinnamomeus
Yellow-bellied sapsucker, Sphyrapicus varius
Acorn woodpecker, Melanerpes formicivorus
Yellow-tufted woodpecker, Melanerpes cruentatus
Beautiful woodpecker, Melanerpes pulcher (E)
Black-cheeked woodpecker, Melanerpes pucherani
Red-crowned woodpecker, Melanerpes rubricapillus
Smoky-brown woodpecker, Dryobates fumigatus
Red-rumped woodpecker, Dryobates kirkii
Little woodpecker, Dryobates passerinus
Scarlet-backed woodpecker, Dryobates callonotus
Yellow-vented woodpecker, Dryobates dignus
Bar-bellied woodpecker, Dryobates nigriceps
Red-stained woodpecker, Dryobates affinis
Choco woodpecker, Dryobates chocoensis 
Powerful woodpecker, Campephilus pollens
Crimson-bellied woodpecker, Campephilus haematogaster
Splendid woodpecker, Campephilus splendens (see note) 
Red-necked woodpecker, Campephilus rubricollis
Crimson-crested woodpecker, Campephilus melanoleucos
Guayaquil woodpecker, Campephilus gayaquilensis
Lineated woodpecker, Dryocopus lineatus
Cinnamon woodpecker, Celeus loricatus
Ringed woodpecker, Celeus torquatus
Scale-breasted woodpecker, Celeus grammicus
Cream-colored woodpecker, Celeus flavus
Rufous-headed woodpecker, Celeus spectabilis
Chestnut woodpecker, Celeus elegans
White-throated woodpecker, Piculus leucolaemus
Lita woodpecker, Piculus litae
Yellow-throated woodpecker, Piculus flavigula
Golden-green woodpecker, Piculus chrysochloros
Golden-olive woodpecker, Colaptes rubiginosus
Crimson-mantled woodpecker, Colaptes rivolii
Spot-breasted woodpecker, Colaptes punctigula

Falcons
Order: FalconiformesFamily: Falconidae

Falconidae is a family of diurnal birds of prey. They differ from hawks, eagles, and kites in that they kill with their beaks instead of their talons. Eighteen species have been recorded in Colombia.

Laughing falcon, Herpetotheres cachinnans
Barred forest-falcon, Micrastur ruficollis
Plumbeous forest-falcon, Micrastur plumbeus 
Lined forest-falcon, Micrastur gilvicollis
Slaty-backed forest-falcon, Micrastur mirandollei
Collared forest-falcon, Micrastur semitorquatus
Buckley's forest-falcon, Micrastur buckleyi (H)
Crested caracara, Caracara plancus
Red-throated caracara, Ibycter americanus
Carunculated caracara, Phalcoboenus carunculatus
Black caracara, Daptrius ater
Yellow-headed caracara, Milvago chimachima
American kestrel, Falco sparverius
Merlin, Falco columbarius
Bat falcon, Falco rufigularis
Orange-breasted falcon, Falco deiroleucus 
Aplomado falcon, Falco femoralis
Peregrine falcon, Falco peregrinus

New World and African parrots
Order: PsittaciformesFamily: Psittacidae

Parrots are small to large birds with a characteristic curved beak. Their upper mandibles have slight mobility in the joint with the skull and they have a generally erect stance. All parrots are zygodactyl, having the four toes on each foot placed two at the front and two to the back. Fifty-six species have been recorded in Colombia.

Lilac-tailed parrotlet, Touit batavicus
Scarlet-shouldered parrotlet, Touit huetii 
Blue-fronted parrotlet, Touit dilectissimus
Sapphire-rumped parrotlet, Touit purpuratus
Spot-winged parrotlet, Touit stictopterus 
Barred parakeet, Bolborhynchus lineola
Rufous-fronted parakeet, Bolborhynchus ferrugineifrons (E) 
Tui parakeet, Brotogeris sanctithomae
Canary-winged parakeet, Brotogeris versicolurus
Orange-chinned parakeet, Brotogeris jugularis
Cobalt-winged parakeet, Brotogeris cyanoptera
Rusty-faced parrot, Hapalopsittaca amazonina 
Indigo-winged parrot, Hapalopsittaca fuertesi (E) 
Brown-hooded parrot, Pyrilia haematotis
Rose-faced parrot, Pyrilia pulchra
Saffron-headed parrot, Pyrilia pyrilia 
Orange-cheeked parrot, Pyrilia barrabandi 
Dusky parrot, Pionus fuscus
Red-billed parrot, Pionus sordidus
Speckle-faced parrot, Pionus tumultuosus
Blue-headed parrot, Pionus menstruus
Bronze-winged parrot, Pionus chalcopterus
Short-tailed parrot, Graydidascalus brachyurus
Festive parrot, Amazona festiva 
Red-lored parrot, Amazona autumnalis
Yellow-crowned parrot, Amazona ochrocephala
Mealy parrot, Amazona farinosa 
Orange-winged parrot, Amazona amazonica
Scaly-naped parrot, Amazona mercenarius
Dusky-billed parrotlet, Forpus modestus
Riparian parrotlet, Forpus crassirostris
Spectacled parrotlet, Forpus conspicillatus
Pacific parrotlet, Forpus coelestis
Green-rumped parrotlet, Forpus passerinus
Turquoise-winged parrotlet, Forpus spengeli (E)
Black-headed parrot, Pionites melanocephalusWhite-bellied parrot, Pionites leucogasterRed-fan parrot, Deroptyus accipitrinusPainted parakeet, Pyrrhura pictaSinu parakeet, Pyrrhura subandina (E) (see note)  
Perija parakeet, Pyrrhura caeruleiceps (E) (see note)  
Santa Marta parakeet, Pyrrhura viridicata (E) 
Maroon-tailed parakeet, Pyrrhura melanuraUpper Magdalena parakeet, Pyrrhura chapmani (E) (see note)  
Brown-breasted parakeet, Pyrrhura calliptera (E) 
Brown-throated parakeet, Eupsittula pertinaxDusky-headed parakeet, Aratinga weddelliiRed-bellied macaw, Orthopsittaca manilatusBlue-and-yellow macaw, Ara araraunaChestnut-fronted macaw, Ara severusMilitary macaw, Ara militaris 
Great green macaw, Ara ambiguus 
Scarlet macaw, Ara macaoRed-and-green macaw, Ara chloropterusGolden-plumed parakeet, Leptosittaca branickii 
Yellow-eared parrot, Ognorhynchus icterotis 
Blue-crowned parakeet, Thectocercus acuticaudatusScarlet-fronted parakeet, Psittacara wagleri 
White-eyed parakeet, Psittacara leucophthalmusSapayoa
Order: PasseriformesFamily: Sapayoidae

The sapayoa is the only member of its family, and is found in the lowland rainforests of Panama and north-western South America. It is usually seen in pairs or mixed-species flocks.

Sapayoa, Sapayoa aenigma  (Donegan calls this species broad-billed sapayoa)

Antbirds
Order: PasseriformesFamily: Thamnophilidae

The antbirds are a large family of small passerine birds of subtropical and tropical Central and South America. They are forest birds which tend to feed on insects at or near the ground. A sizable minority of them specialize in following columns of army ants to eat small invertebrates that leave their hiding places to flee from the ants. Many species lack bright color, with brown, black, and white being the dominant tones. One hundred fourteen species have been recorded in Colombia.

Rufous-rumped antwren, Euchrepomis callinotaAsh-winged antwren, Euchrepomis spodioptilaFasciated antshrike, Cymbilaimus lineatusFulvous antshrike, Frederickena fulvaGreat antshrike, Taraba majorBlack-crested antshrike, Sakesphorus canadensisBarred antshrike, Thamnophilus doliatusBar-crested antshrike, Thamnophilus multistriatusLined antshrike, Thamnophilus tenuepunctatusBlack-crowned antshrike, Thamnophilus atrinuchaPlain-winged antshrike, Thamnophilus schistaceusMouse-colored antshrike, Thamnophilus murinusBlack antshrike, Thamnophilus nigricepsCocha antshrike, Thamnophilus praecoxCastelnau's antshrike, Thamnophilus cryptoleucusBlackish-gray antshrike, Thamnophilus nigrocinereusNorthern slaty-antshrike, Thamnophilus punctatusUniform antshrike, Thamnophilus unicolorWhite-shouldered antshrike, Thamnophilus aethiopsBlack-backed antshrike, Thamnophilus melanonotusAmazonian antshrike, Thamnophilus amazonicusPearly antshrike, Megastictus margaritatusBlack bushbird, Neoctantes nigerRecurve-billed bushbird, Clytoctantes alixiiRusset antshrike, Thamnistes anabatinusRufescent antshrike, Thamnistes rufescensPlain antvireo, Dysithamnus mentalisSpot-crowned antvireo, Dysithamnus puncticepsBicolored antvireo, Dysithamnus occidentalisWhite-streaked antvireo, Dysithamnus leucostictusDugand's antwren, Herpsilochmus dugandiSpot-backed antwren, Herpsilochmus dorsimaculatusYellow-breasted antwren, Herpsilochmus axillarisRufous-margined antwren, Herpsilochmus fraterDusky-throated antshrike, Thamnomanes ardesiacusCinereous antshrike, Thamnomanes caesiusSpiny-faced antshrike, Xenornis setifronsPlain-throated antwren, Isleria hauxwelliSpot-winged antshrike, Pygiptila stellarisChecker-throated stipplethroat, Epinecrophylla fulviventrisOrnate stipplethroat, Epinecrophylla ornataRufous-tailed stipplethroat, Epinecrophylla erythruraRufous-backed stipplethroat, Epinecrophylla haematonotaFoothill stipplethroat, Epinecrophylla spodionotaPygmy antwren, Myrmotherula brachyuraMoustached antwren, Myrmotherula ignotaYellow-throated antwren, Myrmotherula ambiguaGuianan streaked-antwren, Myrmotherula surinamensisAmazonian streaked-antwren, Myrmotherula multostriataPacific antwren, Myrmotherula pacificaCherrie's antwren, Myrmotherula cherrieiStripe-chested antwren, Myrmotherula longicaudaWhite-flanked antwren, Myrmotherula axillarisSlaty antwren, Myrmotherula schisticolorRio Suno antwren, Myrmotherula sunensisLong-winged antwren, Myrmotherula longipennisPlain-winged antwren, Myrmotherula behniGray antwren, Myrmotherula menetriesiiLeaden antwren, Myrmotherula assimilisBanded antbird, Dichrozona cinctaDot-winged antwren, Microrhopias quixensisWhite-fringed antwren, Formicivora griseaStriated antbird, Drymophila devilleiSanta Marta antbird, Drymophila hellmayri (E)
Klages's antbird, Drymophila klagesiEast Andean antbird, Drymophila caudata (E)
Streak-headed antbird, Drymophila striaticepsImeri warbling-antbird, Hypocnemis flavescensPeruvian warbling-antbird, Hypocnemis peruvianaYellow-browed antbird, Hypocnemis hypoxanthaParker's antbird, Cercomacroides parkeri (E)
Dusky antbird, Cercomacroides tyranninaBlack antbird, Cercomacroides servaBlackish antbird, Cercomacroides nigrescensRiparian antbird, Cercomacroides fuscicaudaGray antbird, Cercomacra cinerascensJet antbird, Cercomacra nigricansWestern fire-eye, Pyriglena mauraWhite-browed antbird, Myrmoborus leucophrysAsh-breasted antbird, Myrmoborus lugubrisBlack-faced antbird, Myrmoborus myotherinusBlack-tailed antbird, Myrmoborus melanurus (V) (see note)
Black-chinned antbird, Hypocnemoides melanopogonBand-tailed antbird, Hypocnemoides maculicauda (V) (see note)
Black-and-white antbird, Myrmochanes hemileucusBare-crowned antbird, Gymnocichla nudicepsSilvered antbird, Sclateria naeviaBlack-headed antbird, Percnostola rufifronsSlate-colored antbird, Myrmelastes schistaceusPlumbeous antbird, Myrmelastes hyperythrusSpot-winged antbird, Myrmelastes leucostigmaWhite-bellied antbird, Myrmeciza longipesChestnut-backed antbird, Poliocrania exsulDull-mantled antbird, Sipia laemostica (V)
Magdalena antbird, Sipia palliataEsmeraldas antbird, Sipia nigricaudaStub-tailed antbird, Sipia berlepschiChestnut-tailed antbird, Sciaphylax hemimelaenaWhite-shouldered antbird, Akletos melanocepsSooty antbird, Hafferia fortisZeledon's antbird, Hafferia zeledoniBlue-lored antbird, Hafferia immaculataYapacana antbird, Aprositornis disjunctaBlack-throated antbird, Myrmophylax atrothoraxGray-bellied antbird, Ammonastes pelzelniWing-banded antbird, Myrmornis torquataWhite-plumed antbird, Pithys albifronsBicolored antbird, Gymnopithys bicolorWhite-cheeked antbird, Gymnopithys leucaspisChestnut-crested antbird, Rhegmatorhina cristataHairy-crested antbird, Rhegmatorhina melanostictaSpotted antbird, Hylophylax naevioidesSpot-backed antbird, Hylophylax naeviusDot-backed antbird, Hylophylax punctulatusCommon scale-backed antbird, Willisornis poecilinotus 
Black-spotted bare-eye, Phlegopsis nigromaculataReddish-winged bare-eye, Phlegopsis erythropteraOcellated antbird, Phaenostictus mcleannaniGnateaters
Order: PasseriformesFamily: Conopophagidae

The gnateaters are round, short-tailed, and long-legged birds, which are closely related to the antbirds. Four species have been recorded in Colombia.

Black-crowned antpitta, Pittasoma michleriRufous-crowned antpitta, Pittasoma rufopileatumChestnut-belted gnateater, Conopophaga auritaChestnut-crowned gnateater, Conopophaga castaneicepsAntpittas
Order: PasseriformesFamily: Grallariidae

Antpittas resemble the true pittas with strong, longish legs, very short tails, and stout bills. Thirty-one species have been recorded in Colombia.

Undulated antpitta, Grallaria squamigeraGiant antpitta, Grallaria giganteaMoustached antpitta, Grallaria alleniScaled antpitta, Grallaria guatimalensisPlain-backed antpitta, Grallaria haplonotaOchre-striped antpitta, Grallaria dignissimaChestnut-crowned antpitta, Grallaria ruficapillaSanta Marta antpitta, Grallaria bangsi (E)
Cundinamarca antpitta, Grallaria kaestneri (E)
Chestnut-naped antpitta, Grallaria nuchalisYellow-breasted antpitta, Grallaria flavotinctaWhite-bellied antpitta, Grallaria hypoleucaSierra Nevada antpitta, Grallaria spatior (E)
Perija antpitta, Grallaria saltuensis
Bicolored antpitta, Grallaria rufocinerea
Muisca antpitta, Grallaria rufula
Chami antpitta, Grallaria alvarezi (E)
Equatorial antpitta, Grallaria saturata
Tawny antpitta, Grallaria quitensis
Urrao antpitta, Grallaria urraoensis (E) 
Brown-banded antpitta, Grallaria milleri (E)
Ochre-breasted antpitta, Grallaricula flavirostris
Crescent-faced antpitta, Grallaricula lineifrons
Hooded antpitta, Grallaricula cucullata
Rusty-breasted antpitta, Grallaricula ferrugineipectus
Slate-crowned antpitta, Grallaricula nana
Streak-chested antpitta, Hylopezus perspicillatus
Spotted antpitta, Hylopezus macularius
White-lored antpitta, Myrmothera fulviventris
Thicket antpitta, Myrmothera dives
Thrush-like antpitta, Myrmothera campanisona

Tapaculos
Order: PasseriformesFamily: Rhinocryptidae

The tapaculos are small suboscine passeriform birds with numerous species in South and Central America. They are terrestrial species that fly only poorly on their short wings. They have strong legs, well-suited to their habitat of grassland or forest undergrowth. The tail is cocked and pointed towards the head. Nineteen species have been recorded in Colombia.

Rusty-belted tapaculo, Liosceles thoracicus
Ocellated tapaculo, Acropternis orthonyx
Ash-colored tapaculo, Myornis senilis
Paramo tapaculo, Scytalopus opacus
Paramillo tapaculo, Scytalopus canus (E)
White-crowned tapaculo, Scytalopus atratus
Santa Marta tapaculo, Scytalopus sanctaemartae (E)
Long-tailed tapaculo, Scytalopus micropterus
Blackish tapaculo, Scytalopus latrans
Nariño tapaculo, Scytalopus vicinior
Tacarcuna tapaculo, Scytalopus panamensis
Choco tapaculo, Scytalopus chocoensis
Magdalena tapaculo, Scytalopus rodriguezi (E)
Stiles's tapaculo, Scytalopus stilesi (E)
Tatama tapaculo, Scytalopus alvarezlopezi (E)
Pale-bellied tapaculo, Scytalopus griseicollis
Brown-rumped tapaculo, Scytalopus latebricola (E)
Perija tapaculo, Scytalopus perijanus
Spillmann's tapaculo, Scytalopus spillmanni

Antthrushes
Order: PasseriformesFamily: Formicariidae

The ground antbirds are a group comprising the antthrushes and antpittas. Antthrushes resemble small rails while antpittas resemble the true pittas with strong, longish legs, very short tails, and stout bills. Eight species have been recorded in Colombia.

Rufous-capped antthrush, Formicarius colma
Black-faced antthrush, Formicarius analis
Black-headed antthrush, Formicarius nigricapillus
Rufous-breasted antthrush, Formicarius rufipectus
Short-tailed antthrush, Chamaeza campanisona
Striated antthrush, Chamaeza nobilis
Schwartz's antthrush, Chamaeza turdina
Barred antthrush, Chamaeza mollissima

Ovenbirds
Order: PasseriformesFamily: Furnariidae

Ovenbirds comprise a large family of small sub-oscine passerine bird species found in Central and South America. They are a diverse group of insectivores which gets its name from the elaborate "oven-like" clay nests built by some species, although others build stick nests or nest in tunnels or clefts in rock. The woodcreepers are brownish birds which maintain an upright vertical posture, supported by their stiff tail vanes. They feed mainly on insects taken from tree trunks. One hundred eleven species have been recorded in Colombia.

South American leaftosser, Sclerurus obscurior
Short-billed leaftosser, Sclerurus rufigularis
Scaly-throated leaftosser, Sclerurus guatemalensis
Black-tailed leaftosser, Sclerurus caudacutus
Gray-throated leaftosser, Sclerurus albigularis
Spot-throated woodcreeper, Certhiasomus stictolaemus
Olivaceous woodcreeper, Sittasomus griseicapillus
Long-tailed woodcreeper, Deconychura longicauda
Tyrannine woodcreeper, Dendrocincla tyrannina
White-chinned woodcreeper, Dendrocincla merula
Ruddy woodcreeper, Dendrocincla homochroa
Plain-brown woodcreeper, Dendrocincla fuliginosa
Wedge-billed woodcreeper, Glyphorynchus spirurus
Cinnamon-throated woodcreeper, Dendrexetastes rufigula
Long-billed woodcreeper, Nasica longirostris
Northern barred-woodcreeper, Dendrocolaptes sanctithomae
Amazonian barred-woodcreeper, Dendrocolaptes certhia
Black-banded woodcreeper, Dendrocolaptes picumnus
Bar-bellied woodcreeper, Hylexetastes stresemanni
Strong-billed woodcreeper, Xiphocolaptes promeropirhynchus
Striped woodcreeper, Xiphorhynchus obsoletus
Ocellated woodcreeper, Xiphorhynchus ocellatus
Elegant woodcreeper, Xiphorhynchus elegans
Cocoa woodcreeper, Xiphorhynchus susurrans
Buff-throated woodcreeper, Xiphorhynchus guttatus
Black-striped woodcreeper, Xiphorhynchus lachrymosus
Spotted woodcreeper, Xiphorhynchus erythropygius
Olive-backed woodcreeper, Xiphorhynchus triangularis
Straight-billed woodcreeper, Dendroplex picus
Zimmer's woodcreeper, Dendroplex kienerii
Red-billed scythebill, Campylorhamphus trochilirostris
Curve-billed scythebill, Campylorhamphus procurvoides
Brown-billed scythebill, Campylorhamphus pusillus
Greater scythebill, Drymotoxeres pucheranii
Streak-headed woodcreeper, Lepidocolaptes souleyetii
Montane woodcreeper, Lepidocolaptes lacrymiger
Duida woodcreeper, Lepidocolaptes duidae (H)
Slender-billed xenops, Xenops tenuirostris
Plain xenops, Xenops minutus
Streaked xenops, Xenops rutilans
Point-tailed palmcreeper, Berlepschia rikeri
Rufous-tailed xenops, Microxenops milleri
Pacific tuftedcheek, Pseudocolaptes johnsoni
Streaked tuftedcheek, Pseudocolaptes boissonneautii
Rusty-winged barbtail, Premnornis guttuliger
Pale-legged hornero, Furnarius leucopus
Pale-billed hornero, Furnarius torridus
Lesser hornero, Furnarius minor
Sharp-tailed streamcreeper, Lochmias nematura
Chestnut-winged cinclodes, Cinclodes albidiventris
Stout-billed cinclodes, Cinclodes excelsior
Dusky-cheeked foliage-gleaner, Anabazenops dorsalis
Slaty-winged foliage-gleaner, Philydor fuscipenne
Rufous-rumped foliage-gleaner, Philydor erythrocercum
Cinnamon-rumped foliage-gleaner, Philydor pyrrhodes
Montane foliage-gleaner, Anabacerthia striaticollis
Scaly-throated foliage-gleaner, Anabacerthia variegaticeps
Rufous-tailed foliage-gleaner, Anabacerthia ruficaudata
Lineated foliage-gleaner, Syndactyla subalaris
Chestnut-winged hookbill, Ancistrops strigilatus
Buff-fronted foliage-gleaner, Dendroma rufa
Chestnut-winged foliage-gleaner, Dendroma erythroptera
Ruddy foliage-gleaner, Clibanornis rubiginosus
Santa Marta foliage-gleaner, Clibanornis rufipectus (E)
Uniform treehunter, Thripadectes ignobilis
Flammulated treehunter, Thripadectes flammulatus
Striped treehunter, Thripadectes holostictus
Streak-capped treehunter, Thripadectes virgaticeps
Black-billed treehunter, Thripadectes melanorhynchus
Chestnut-crowned foliage-gleaner, Automolus rufipileatus
Brown-rumped foliage-gleaner, Automolus melanopezus
Buff-throated foliage-gleaner, Automolus ochrolaemus
Striped woodhaunter, Automolus subulatus
Olive-backed foliage-gleaner, Automolus infuscatus
Spotted barbtail, Premnoplex brunnescens
Fulvous-dotted treerunner, Margarornis stellatus
Pearled treerunner, Margarornis squamiger
Andean tit-spinetail, Leptasthenura andicola
Rufous-fronted thornbird, Phacellodomus rufifrons
White-browed spinetail, Hellmayrea gularis
Many-striped canastero, Asthenes flammulata
Streak-backed canastero, Asthenes wyatti
Perija thistletail, Asthenes perijana
White-chinned thistletail, Asthenes fuliginosa
Orange-fronted plushcrown, Metopothrix aurantiaca
Double-banded graytail, Xenerpestes minlosi
Spectacled prickletail, Siptornis striaticollis
Orinoco softtail, Thripophaga cherriei
Rusty-backed spinetail, Cranioleuca vulpina
Crested spinetail, Cranioleuca subcristata
Red-faced spinetail, Cranioleuca erythrops
Streak-capped spinetail, Cranioleuca hellmayri
Ash-browed spinetail, Cranioleuca curtata
Speckled spinetail, Cranioleuca gutturata
Yellow-chinned spinetail, Certhiaxis cinnamomeus
Red-and-white spinetail, Certhiaxis mustelinus
White-bellied spinetail, Mazaria propinqua (H)
Plain-crowned spinetail, Synallaxis gujanensis
Slaty spinetail, Synallaxis brachyura
Silvery-throated spinetail, Synallaxis subpudica (E)
Dusky spinetail, Synallaxis moesta
Dark-breasted spinetail, Synallaxis albigularis
Rio Orinoco spinetail, Synallaxis beverlyae (H)
Pale-breasted spinetail, Synallaxis albescens
Azara's spinetail, Synallaxis azarae
White-whiskered spinetail, Synallaxis candei
Rusty-headed spinetail, Synallaxis fuscorufa (E)
Rufous spinetail, Synallaxis unirufa
Stripe-breasted spinetail, Synallaxis cinnamomea
Ruddy spinetail, Synallaxis rutilans
Chestnut-throated spinetail, Synallaxis cherriei

Manakins
Order: PasseriformesFamily: Pipridae

The manakins are a family of subtropical and tropical mainland Central and South America, and Trinidad and Tobago. They are compact forest birds, the males typically being brightly colored, although the females of most species are duller and usually green-plumaged. Manakins feed on small fruits, berries and insects. Twenty-one species have been recorded in Colombia.

Dwarf tyrant-manakin, Tyranneutes stolzmanni
Saffron-crested tyrant-manakin, Neopelma chrysocephalum
Yellow-headed manakin, Chloropipo flavicapilla
Lance-tailed manakin, Chiroxiphia lanceolata
Blue-backed manakin, Chiroxiphia pareola
Golden-winged manakin, Masius chrysopterus
White-ruffed manakin, Corapipo altera
White-bibbed manakin, Corapipo leucorrhoa
Black manakin, Xenopipo atronitens
Green manakin, Cryptopipo holochlora
Velvety manakin,  Lepidothrix velutina
Blue-capped manakin, Lepidothrix coronata
Blue-rumped manakin, Lepidothrix isidorei
Yellow-crowned manakin, Heterocercus flavivertex
White-bearded manakin, Manacus manacus
Wire-tailed manakin, Pipra filicauda
Club-winged manakin, Machaeropterus deliciosus
Striolated manakin, Machaeropterus striolatus
White-crowned manakin, Pseudopipra pipra
Red-capped manakin, Ceratopipra mentalis
Golden-headed manakin, Ceratopipra erythrocephala

Cotingas
Order: PasseriformesFamily: Cotingidae

The cotingas are birds of forests or forest edges in tropical South America. Comparatively little is known about this diverse group, although all have broad bills with hooked tips, rounded wings, and strong legs. The males of many of the species are brightly colored or decorated with plumes or wattles. Thirty-four species have been recorded in Colombia.

Green-and-black fruiteater, Pipreola riefferii
Barred fruiteater, Pipreola arcuata
Golden-breasted fruiteater, Pipreola aureopectus
Orange-breasted fruiteater, Pipreola jucunda
Black-chested fruiteater, Pipreola lubomirskii
Fiery-throated fruiteater, Pipreola chlorolepidota
Scaled fruiteater, Ampelioides tschudii
Chestnut-bellied cotinga, Doliornis remseni
Red-crested cotinga, Ampelion rubrocristata
Chestnut-crested cotinga, Ampelion rufaxilla
Black-necked red-cotinga, Phoenicircus nigricollis
Guianan cock-of-the-rock, Rupicola rupicola
Andean cock-of-the-rock, Rupicola peruviana
Gray-tailed piha, Snowornis subalaris
Olivaceous piha, Snowornis cryptolophus
Crimson fruitcrow, Haematoderus militaris (H)
Purple-throated fruitcrow, Querula purpurata
Red-ruffed fruitcrow, Pyroderus scutatus
Amazonian umbrellabird, Cephalopterus ornatus
Long-wattled umbrellabird, Cephalopterus penduliger
Capuchinbird, Perissocephalus tricolor
Blue cotinga, Cotinga nattererii
Plum-throated cotinga, Cotinga maynana
Purple-breasted cotinga, Cotinga cotinga
Spangled cotinga, Cotinga cayana
Rufous piha, Lipaugus unirufus
Screaming piha, Lipaugus vociferans
Chestnut-capped piha, Lipaugus weberi (E) 
Dusky piha, Lipaugus fuscocinereus
Bearded bellbird, Procnias averano
Purple-throated cotinga, Porphyrolaema porphyrolaema
Black-tipped cotinga, Carpodectes hopkei
Pompadour cotinga, Xipholena punicea
Bare-necked fruitcrow, Gymnoderus foetidus

Tityras
Order: PasseriformesFamily: Tityridae

Tityridae are suboscine passerine birds found in forest and woodland in the Neotropics. The species in this family were formerly spread over the families Tyrannidae, Pipridae, and Cotingidae. They are small to medium-sized birds. They do not have the sophisticated vocal capabilities of the songbirds. Most, but not all, have plain coloring. Twenty-two species have been recorded in Colombia.

Black-crowned tityra, Tityra inquisitor
Black-tailed tityra, Tityra cayana
Masked tityra, Tityra semifasciata
Varzea schiffornis, Schiffornis major
Northern schiffornis, Schiffornis veraepacis
Foothill schiffornis, Schiffornis aenea
Russet-winged schiffornis, Schiffornis stenorhyncha
Brown-winged schiffornis, Schiffornis turdina
Speckled mourner, Laniocera rufescens
Cinereous mourner, Laniocera hypopyrra
White-browed purpletuft, Iodopleura isabellae
Shrike-like cotinga, Laniisoma elegans
Green-backed becard, Pachyramphus viridis
Barred becard, Pachyramphus versicolor
Cinereous becard, Pachyramphus rufus
Cinnamon becard, Pachyramphus cinnamomeus
Chestnut-crowned becard, Pachyramphus castaneus
White-winged becard, Pachyramphus polychopterus
Black-and-white becard, Pachyramphus albogriseus
Black-capped becard, Pachyramphus marginatus
One-colored becard, Pachyramphus homochrous
Pink-throated becard, Pachyramphus minor

Sharpbill
Order: PasseriformesFamily: Oxyruncidae

The sharpbill is a small bird of dense forests in Central and South America. It feeds mostly on fruit but also eats insects.

Sharpbill, Oxyruncus cristatus

Royal flycatchers
Order: PasseriformesFamily: Onychorhynchidae

In 2019 the SACC determined that these five species, which were formerly considered tyrant flycatchers, belonged in their own family.

Royal flycatcher, Onychorhynchus coronatus
Ruddy-tailed flycatcher, Terenotriccus erythrurus
Tawny-breasted flycatcher, Myiobius villosus
Sulphur-rumped flycatcher, Myiobius barbatus
Black-tailed flycatcher, Myiobius atricaudus

Tyrant flycatchers
Order: PasseriformesFamily: Tyrannidae

Tyrant flycatchers are passerine birds which occur throughout North and South America. They superficially resemble the Old World flycatchers, but are more robust and have stronger bills. They do not have the sophisticated vocal capabilities of the songbirds. Most, but not all, have plain coloring. As the name implies, most are insectivorous. Two hundred species have been recorded in Colombia.

Wing-barred piprites, Piprites chloris
Cinnamon manakin-tyrant, Neopipo cinnamomea
Cinnamon-crested spadebill, Platyrinchus saturatus
White-throated spadebill, Platyrinchus mystaceus
Golden-crowned spadebill, Platyrinchus coronatus
Yellow-throated spadebill, Platyrinchus flavigularis
White-crested spadebill, Platyrinchus platyrhynchos
Bronze-olive pygmy-tyrant, Pseudotriccus pelzelni
Rufous-headed pygmy-tyrant, Pseudotriccus ruficeps
Ringed antpipit, Corythopis torquatus
Variegated bristle-tyrant, Phylloscartes poecilotis
Marble-faced bristle-tyrant, Phylloscartes ophthalmicus
Antioquia bristle-tyrant, Phylloscartes lanyoni (E)
Spectacled bristle-tyrant, Phylloscartes orbitalis
Ecuadorian tyrannulet, Phylloscartes gualaquizae
Rufous-browed tyrannulet, Phylloscartes superciliaris
Streak-necked flycatcher, Mionectes striaticollis
Olive-striped flycatcher, Mionectes olivaceus
Ochre-bellied flycatcher, Mionectes oleagineus
Sepia-capped flycatcher, Leptopogon amaurocephalus
Slaty-capped flycatcher, Leptopogon superciliaris
Rufous-breasted flycatcher, Leptopogon rufipectus
Brownish twistwing, Cnipodectes subbrunneus
Olivaceous flatbill, Rhynchocyclus olivaceus
Eye-ringed flatbill, Rhynchocyclus brevirostris
Pacific flatbill, Rhynchocyclus pacificus
Fulvous-breasted flatbill, Rhynchocyclus fulvipectus
Yellow-olive flycatcher, Tolmomyias sulphurescens
Orange-eyed flycatcher, Tolmomyias traylori
Yellow-margined flycatcher, Tolmomyias assimilis
Gray-crowned flycatcher, Tolmomyias poliocephalus
Yellow-breasted flycatcher, Tolmomyias flaviventris
Black-capped pygmy-tyrant, Myiornis atricapillus
Short-tailed pygmy-tyrant, Myiornis ecaudatus
Northern bentbill, Oncostoma cinereigulare
Southern bentbill, Oncostoma olivaceum
Scale-crested pygmy-tyrant, Lophotriccus pileatus
Double-banded pygmy-tyrant, Lophotriccus vitiosus
Helmeted pygmy-tyrant, Lophotriccus galeatus
Pale-eyed pygmy-tyrant, Atalotriccus pilaris
White-eyed tody-tyrant, Hemitriccus zosterops
Johannes's tody-tyrant, Hemitriccus iohannis
Stripe-necked tody-tyrant, Hemitriccus striaticollis
Pearly-vented tody-tyrant, Hemitriccus margaritaceiventer
Black-throated tody-tyrant, Hemitriccus granadensis
Buff-throated tody-tyrant, Hemitriccus rufigularis
Rufous-crowned tody-flycatcher, Poecilotriccus ruficeps
Black-and-white tody-flycatcher, Poecilotriccus capitalis
Rusty-fronted tody-flycatcher, Poecilotriccus latirostris
Slate-headed tody-flycatcher, Poecilotriccus sylvia
Golden-winged tody-flycatcher, Poecilotriccus calopterus
Spotted tody-flycatcher, Todirostrum maculatum
Common tody-flycatcher, Todirostrum cinereum
Black-headed tody-flycatcher, Todirostrum nigriceps
Yellow-browed tody-flycatcher, Todirostrum chrysocrotaphum
Ornate flycatcher, Myiotriccus ornatus
Handsome flycatcher, Nephelomyias pulcher
Cliff flycatcher, Hirundinea ferruginea
Cinnamon flycatcher, Pyrrhomyias cinnamomeus
Mistletoe tyrannulet, Zimmerius vilissimus
Spectacled tyrannulet, Zimmerius improbus
Choco tyrannulet, Zimmerius albigularis
Slender-footed tyrannulet, Zimmerius gracilipes
Golden-faced tyrannulet, Zimmerius chrysops
Lesser wagtail-tyrant, Stigmatura napensis
Slender-billed tyrannulet, Inezia tenuirostris
Amazonian tyrannulet, Inezia subflava
Pale-tipped tyrannulet, Inezia caudata
Fulvous-crowned scrub-tyrant, Euscarthmus meloryphus
Brown-capped tyrannulet, Ornithion brunneicapillus
White-lored tyrannulet, Ornithion inerme
Southern beardless-tyrannulet, Camptostoma obsoletum
Yellow-bellied elaenia, Elaenia flavogaster
Caribbean elaenia, Elaenia martinica
Large elaenia, Elaenia spectabilis
White-crested elaenia, Elaenia albiceps
Small-billed elaenia, Elaenia parvirostris
Slaty elaenia, Elaenia strepera
Mottle-backed elaenia, Elaenia gigas
Brownish elaenia, Elaenia pelzelni (H)
Plain-crested elaenia, Elaenia cristata
Lesser elaenia, Elaenia chiriquensis
Coopmans's elaenia, Elaenia brachyptera
Rufous-crowned elaenia, Elaenia ruficeps
Mountain elaenia, Elaenia frantzii
Sierran elaenia, Elaenia pallatangae
Yellow-crowned tyrannulet, Tyrannulus elatus
Forest elaenia, Myiopagis gaimardii
Gray elaenia, Myiopagis caniceps
Foothill elaenia, Myiopagis olallai
Yellow-crowned elaenia, Myiopagis flavivertex
Greenish elaenia, Myiopagis viridicata
Yellow tyrannulet, Capsiempis flaveola
Rough-legged tyrannulet, Phyllomyias burmeisteri
Sooty-headed tyrannulet, Phyllomyias griseiceps
Black-capped tyrannulet, Phyllomyias nigrocapillus
Ashy-headed tyrannulet, Phyllomyias cinereiceps
Tawny-rumped tyrannulet, Phyllomyias uropygialis
Plumbeous-crowned tyrannulet, Phyllomyias plumbeiceps
Mouse-colored tyrannulet, Phaeomyias murina
White-tailed tyrannulet, Mecocerculus poecilocercus
White-banded tyrannulet, Mecocerculus stictopterus
White-throated tyrannulet, Mecocerculus leucophrys
Sulphur-bellied tyrannulet, Mecocerculus minor
Tufted tit-tyrant, Anairetes parulus
Bearded tachuri, Polystictus pectoralis
Subtropical doradito, Pseudocolopteryx acutipennis
Torrent tyrannulet, Serpophaga cinerea
River tyrannulet, Serpophaga hypoleuca
Agile tit-tyrant, Uromyias agilis
Short-tailed field tyrant, Muscigralla brevicauda (V)
Cinnamon attila, Attila cinnamomeus
Ochraceous attila, Attila torridus
Citron-bellied attila, Attila citriniventris
Dull-capped attila, Attila bolivianus
Bright-rumped attila, Attila spadiceus
Piratic flycatcher, Legatus leucophaius
Large-headed flatbill, Ramphotrigon megacephalum
Rufous-tailed flatbill, Ramphotrigon ruficauda
Dusky-tailed flatbill, Ramphotrigon fuscicauda
Great kiskadee, Pitangus sulphuratus
Lesser kiskadee, Pitangus lictor
Cattle tyrant, Machetornis rixosa
Sulphury flycatcher, Tyrannopsis sulphurea
Boat-billed flycatcher, Megarynchus pitangua
Golden-crowned flycatcher, Myiodynastes chrysocephalus
Sulphur-bellied flycatcher, Myiodynastes luteiventris
Streaked flycatcher, Myiodynastes maculatus
Rusty-margined flycatcher, Myiozetetes cayanensis
Social flycatcher, Myiozetetes similis
Gray-capped flycatcher, Myiozetetes granadensis
Dusky-chested flycatcher, Myiozetetes luteiventris
White-ringed flycatcher, Conopias albovittatus
Yellow-throated flycatcher, Conopias parvus
Lemon-browed flycatcher, Conopias cinchoneti
White-bearded flycatcher, Phelpsia inornata
Variegated flycatcher, Empidonomus varius
Crowned slaty flycatcher, Empidonomus aurantioatrocristatus
Snowy-throated kingbird, Tyrannus niveigularis
White-throated kingbird, Tyrannus albogularis (H)
Tropical kingbird, Tyrannus melancholicus
Scissor-tailed flycatcher, Tyrannus forficatus (V)
Couch's kingbird, Tyrannus couchii (SA)
Fork-tailed flycatcher, Tyrannus savana
Eastern kingbird, Tyrannus tyrannus
Gray kingbird, Tyrannus dominicensis
Rufous mourner, Rhytipterna holerythra
Grayish mourner, Rhytipterna simplex
Pale-bellied mourner, Rhytipterna immunda
Choco sirystes, Sirystes albogriseus
White-rumped sirystes, Sirystes albocinereus
Dusky-capped flycatcher, Myiarchus tuberculifer
Swainson's flycatcher, Myiarchus swainsoni
Venezuelan flycatcher, Myiarchus venezuelensis
Panama flycatcher, Myiarchus panamensis
Short-crested flycatcher, Myiarchus ferox
Apical flycatcher, Myiarchus apicalis (E)
Pale-edged flycatcher, Myiarchus cephalotes
Great crested flycatcher, Myiarchus crinitus
Brown-crested flycatcher, Myiarchus tyrannulus
Long-tailed tyrant, Colonia colonus
Flavescent flycatcher, Myiophobus flavicans
Orange-crested flycatcher, Myiophobus phoenicomitra
Bran-colored flycatcher, Myiophobus fasciatus
Crowned chat-tyrant, Ochthoeca frontalis
Yellow-bellied chat-tyrant, Ochthoeca diadema
Slaty-backed chat-tyrant, Ochthoeca cinnamomeiventris
Rufous-breasted chat-tyrant, Ochthoeca rufipectoralis
Brown-backed chat-tyrant, Ochthoeca fumicolor
Northern scrub-flycatcher, Sublegatus arenarum
Amazonian scrub-flycatcher, Sublegatus obscurior
Southern scrub-flycatcher, Sublegatus modestus
Vermilion flycatcher, Pyrocephalus rubinus
Pied water-tyrant, Fluvicola pica
Masked water-tyrant, Fluvicola nengeta
White-headed marsh tyrant, Arundinicola leucocephala
Riverside tyrant, Knipolegus orenocensis
Rufous-tailed tyrant, Knipolegus poecilurus
Amazonian black-tyrant, Knipolegus poecilocercus
Yellow-browed tyrant, Satrapa icterophrys
Little ground-tyrant, Muscisaxicola fluviatilis (H)
Spot-billed ground-tyrant, Muscisaxicola maculirostris
White-browed ground-tyrant, Muscisaxicola albilora (V)
Plain-capped ground-tyrant, Muscisaxicola alpinus
Red-rumped bush-tyrant, Cnemarchus erythropygius
Black-billed shrike-tyrant, Agriornis montanus
Streak-throated bush-tyrant, Myiotheretes striaticollis
Santa Marta bush-tyrant, Myiotheretes pernix (E)
Smoky bush-tyrant, Myiotheretes fumigatus
Drab water tyrant, Ochthornis littoralis
Fuscous flycatcher, Cnemotriccus fuscatus
Black-billed flycatcher, Aphanotriccus audax
Euler's flycatcher, Lathrotriccus euleri
Tufted flycatcher, Mitrephanes phaeocercus
Black phoebe, Sayornis nigricans
Acadian flycatcher, Empidonax virescens
Willow flycatcher, Empidonax traillii
Least flycatcher, Empidonax minimus (SA)
Alder flycatcher, Empidonax alnorum
Olive-sided flycatcher, Contopus cooperi
Smoke-colored pewee, Contopus fumigatus
Western wood-pewee, Contopus sordidulus
Eastern wood-pewee, Contopus virens
Tropical pewee, Contopus cinereus

Vireos
Order: PasseriformesFamily: Vireonidae

The vireos are a group of small to medium-sized passerine birds. They are typically greenish in color and resemble wood warblers apart from their heavier bills. Twenty-two species have been recorded in Colombia.

Rufous-browed peppershrike, Cyclarhis gujanensis
Black-billed peppershrike, Cyclarhis nigrirostris
Scrub greenlet, Hylophilus flavipes
Gray-chested greenlet, Hylophilus semicinereus (H)
Brown-headed greenlet, Hylophilus brunneiceps
Lemon-chested greenlet, Hylophilus thoracicus
Yellow-browed shrike-vireo, Vireolanius eximius
Slaty-capped shrike-vireo, Vireolanius leucotis
Tawny-crowned greenlet, Tunchiornis ochraceiceps
Lesser greenlet, Pachysylvia decurtata
Dusky-capped greenlet, Pachysylvia hypoxantha
Golden-fronted greenlet, Pachysylvia aurantiifrons
Rufous-naped greenlet, Pachysylvia semibrunnea
White-eyed vireo, Vireo griseus (SA)
San Andres vireo, Vireo caribaeus (SA)
Yellow-throated vireo, Vireo flavifrons
Choco vireo, Vireo masteri
Philadelphia vireo, Vireo philadelphicus
Brown-capped vireo, Vireo leucophrys
Red-eyed vireo, Vireo olivaceus
Chivi vireo, Vireo chivi
Yellow-green vireo, Vireo flavoviridis
Black-whiskered vireo, Vireo altiloquus

Jays
Order: PasseriformesFamily: Corvidae

The family Corvidae includes crows, ravens, jays, choughs, magpies, treepies, nutcrackers, and ground jays. Corvids are above average in size among the Passeriformes, and some of the larger species show high levels of intelligence. Seven species have been recorded in Colombia.

Black-collared jay, Cyanolyca armillata
Turquoise jay, Cyanolyca turcosa
Beautiful jay, Cyanolyca pulchra
Violaceous jay, Cyanocorax violaceus
Black-chested jay, Cyanocorax affinis
Azure-naped jay, Cyanocorax heilprini
Green jay, Cyanocorax yncas

Larks
Order: PasseriformesFamily: Alaudidae

Larks are small terrestrial birds with often extravagant songs and display flights. Most larks are fairly dull in appearance. Their food is insects and seeds. One species has been recorded in Colombia.

Horned lark, Eremophila alpestris

Swallows
Order: PasseriformesFamily: Hirundinidae

The family Hirundinidae is adapted to aerial feeding. They have a slender streamlined body, long pointed wings, and a short bill with a wide gape. The feet are adapted to perching rather than walking, and the front toes are partially joined at the base. Seventeen species have been recorded in Colombia.

Blue-and-white swallow, Pygochelidon cyanoleuca
Black-collared swallow, Pygochelidon melanoleuca
Tawny-headed swallow, Alopochelidon fucata
Brown-bellied swallow, Orochelidon murina
Pale-footed swallow, Orochelidon flavipes
White-banded swallow, Atticora fasciata
White-thighed swallow, Atticora tibialis
Southern rough-winged swallow, Stelgidopteryx ruficollis
Brown-chested martin, Progne tapera
Purple martin, Progne subis
Gray-breasted martin, Progne chalybea
Southern martin, Progne elegans (H)
Tree swallow, Tachycineta bicolor
White-winged swallow, Tachycineta albiventer
Bank swallow, Riparia riparia
Barn swallow, Hirundo rustica
Cliff swallow, Petrochelidon pyrrhonota
Cave swallow, Petrochelidon fulva (V) (SA)

Wrens
Order: PasseriformesFamily: Troglodytidae

The wrens are mainly small and inconspicuous except for their loud songs. These birds have short wings and thin down-turned bills. Several species often hold their tails upright. All are insectivorous. Colombia has the greatest diversity of wrens on earth; thirty-five species have been recorded in the country.

Scaly-breasted wren, Microcerculus marginatus
Gray-mantled wren, Odontorchilus branickii
House wren, Troglodytes aedon
Ochraceous wren, Troglodytes ochraceus
Mountain wren, Troglodytes solstitialis
Santa Marta wren, Troglodytes monticola (E)  
Grass wren, Cistothorus platensis
Apolinar's wren, Cistothorus apolinari (E)
White-headed wren, Campylorhynchus albobrunneus
Band-backed wren, Campylorhynchus zonatus
Stripe-backed wren, Campylorhynchus nuchalis
Bicolored wren, Campylorhynchus griseus
Thrush-like wren, Campylorhynchus turdinus
Sooty-headed wren, Pheugopedius spadix
Black-bellied wren, Pheugopedius fasciatoventris
Plain-tailed wren, Pheugopedius euophrys
Whiskered wren, Pheugopedius mystacalis
Coraya wren, Pheugopedius coraya
Rufous-breasted wren, Pheugopedius rutilus
Speckle-breasted wren, Pheugopedius sclateri
Rufous-and-white wren, Thryophilus rufalbus
Antioquia wren, Thryophilus sernai (E)
Niceforo's wren, Thryophilus nicefori (E)  
Stripe-throated wren, Cantorchilus leucopogon
Bay wren, Cantorchilus nigricapillus
Buff-breasted wren, Cantorchilus leucotis
Rufous wren, Cinnycerthia unirufa
Sharpe's wren, Cinnycerthia olivascens
White-breasted wood-wren, Henicorhina leucosticta
Gray-breasted wood-wren, Henicorhina leucophrys
Hermit wood-wren, Henicorhina anachoreta (E)
Munchique wood-wren, Henicorhina negreti (E)
Chestnut-breasted wren, Cyphorhinus thoracicus
Song wren, Cyphorhinus phaeocephalus
Musician wren, Cyphorhinus aradus

Gnatcatchers
Order: PasseriformesFamily: Polioptilidae

These dainty birds resemble Old World warblers in their build and habits, moving restlessly through the foliage seeking insects. The gnatcatchers and gnatwrens are mainly soft bluish gray in color and have the typical insectivore's long sharp bill. They are birds of fairly open woodland or scrub, which nest in bushes or trees. Six species have been recorded in Colombia.

Collared gnatwren, Microbates collaris
Half-collared gnatwren, Microbates cinereiventris
Trilling gnatwren, Ramphocaenus melanurus
Tropical gnatcatcher, Polioptila plumbea
Rio Negro gnatcatcher, Polioptila facilis (H)
Slate-throated gnatcatcher, Polioptila schistaceigula

Donacobius
Order: PasseriformesFamily: Donacobiidae

The black-capped donacobius is found in wet habitats from Panama across northern South America and east of the Andes to Argentina and Paraguay.

Black-capped donacobius, Donacobius atricapilla

Dippers
Order: PasseriformesFamily: Cinclidae

Dippers are a group of perching birds whose habitat includes aquatic environments in the Americas, Europe, and Asia. They are named for their bobbing or dipping movements. One species has been recorded in Colombia.

White-capped dipper, Cinclus leucocephalus

Waxwings
Order: PasseriformesFamily: Bombycillidae

The waxwings are a group of birds with soft silky plumage and unique red tips to some of the wing feathers. In the Bohemian and cedar waxwings, these tips look like sealing wax and give the group its name. These are arboreal birds of northern forests. They live on insects in summer and berries in winter. One species has been recorded in Colombia.

Cedar waxwing, Bombycilla cedrorum (V)

Thrushes
Order: PasseriformesFamily: Turdidae

The thrushes are a group of passerine birds that occur mainly in the Old World. They are plump, soft plumaged, small to medium-sized insectivores or sometimes omnivores, often feeding on the ground. Many have attractive songs. Twenty-nine species have been recorded in Colombia.

Varied solitaire, Myadestes coloratus
Andean solitaire, Myadestes ralloides
Orange-billed nightingale-thrush, Catharus aurantiirostris
Slaty-backed nightingale-thrush, Catharus fuscater
Speckled nightingale-thrush, Catharus maculatus
Veery, Catharus fuscescens
Gray-cheeked thrush, Catharus minimus
Swainson's thrush, Catharus ustulatus
Wood thrush, Hylocichla mustelina
Black solitaire, Entomodestes coracinus
Rufous-brown solitaire, Cichlopsis leucogenys
Pale-eyed thrush, Turdus leucops
Yellow-legged thrush, Turdus flavipes
Pale-breasted thrush, Turdus leucomelas
Cocoa thrush, Turdus fumigatus
Hauxwell's thrush, Turdus hauxwelli
Pale-vented thrush, Turdus obsoletus
Clay-colored thrush, Turdus grayi
Spectacled thrush, Turdus nudigenis
Varzea thrush, Turdus sanchezorum
Lawrence's thrush, Turdus lawrencii
Black-billed thrush, Turdus ignobilis
Campina thrush, Turdus arthuri
Chestnut-bellied thrush, Turdus fulviventris
Black-hooded thrush, Turdus olivater
Great thrush, Turdus fuscater
Glossy-black thrush, Turdus serranus
White-throated thrush, Turdus assimilis
White-necked thrush, Turdus albicollis

Mockingbirds
Order: PasseriformesFamily: Mimidae

The mimids are a family of passerine birds that includes thrashers, mockingbirds, tremblers, and the New World catbirds. These birds are notable for their vocalizations, especially their ability to mimic a wide variety of birds and other sounds heard outdoors. Their coloring tends towards dull-grays and browns. Two species have been recorded in Colombia.

Gray catbird, Dumetella carolinensis
Tropical mockingbird, Mimus gilvus

Estreldids
Order: PasseriformesFamily: Estrildidae

The members of this family are small passerine birds native to the Old World tropics. They are gregarious and often colonial seed eaters with short thick but pointed bills. They are all similar in structure and habits, but have wide variation in plumage colors and patterns. One species has been recorded in Colombia.

Tricolored munia, Lonchura malacca (I)

Old World sparrows
Order: PasseriformesFamily: Passeridae

Sparrows are small passerine birds. In general, sparrows tend to be small, plump, brown or gray birds with short tails and short powerful beaks. Sparrows are seed eaters, but they also consume small insects. One species has been recorded in Colombia.

House sparrow, Passer domesticus (I)

Pipits and wagtails
Order: PasseriformesFamily: Motacillidae

Motacillidae is a family of small passerine birds with medium to long tails. They include the wagtails, longclaws, and pipits. They are slender ground-feeding insectivores of open country. Three species have been recorded in Colombia.

American pipit, Anthus rubescens (SA) (H)
Yellowish pipit, Anthus chii
Paramo pipit, Anthus bogotensis

Finches
Order: PasseriformesFamily: Fringillidae

Finches are seed-eating passerine birds, that are small to moderately large and have a strong beak, usually conical and in some species very large. All have twelve tail feathers and nine primaries. These birds have a bouncing flight with alternating bouts of flapping and gliding on closed wings, and most sing well. Twenty-three species have been recorded in Colombia.

Andean siskin, Spinus spinescens
Yellow-faced siskin, Spinus yarrellii (V)
Red siskin, Spinus cucullatus
Hooded siskin, Spinus magellanicus
Yellow-bellied siskin, Spinus xanthogastrus
Lesser goldfinch, Spinus psaltria
Golden-rumped euphonia, Chlorophonia cyanocephala
Blue-naped chlorophonia, Chlorophonia cyanea
Chestnut-breasted chlorophonia, Chlorophonia pyrrhophrys
Yellow-collared chlorophonia, Chlorophonia flavirostris
Orange-crowned euphonia, Euphonia saturata
Plumbeous euphonia, Euphonia plumbea
Purple-throated euphonia, Euphonia chlorotica
Velvet-fronted euphonia, Euphonia concinna (E)
Trinidad euphonia, Euphonia trinitatis
Golden-bellied euphonia, Euphonia chrysopasta
White-vented euphonia, Euphonia minuta
Thick-billed euphonia, Euphonia laniirostris
Fulvous-vented euphonia, Euphonia fulvicrissa
Tawny-capped euphonia, Euphonia anneae
Orange-bellied euphonia, Euphonia xanthogaster
Bronze-green euphonia, Euphonia mesochrysa
Rufous-bellied euphonia, Euphonia rufiventris

Thrush-tanager
Order: PasseriformesFamily: Rhodinocichlidae

This species was historically placed in family Thraupidae. It was placed in its own family in 2017.

Rosy thrush-tanager, Rhodinocichla rosea

Sparrows
Order: PasseriformesFamily: Passerellidae

Most of the species are known as sparrows, but these birds are not closely related to the Old World sparrows which are in the family Passeridae. Many of these have distinctive head patterns. Thirty-nine species have been recorded in Colombia.

Tanager finch, Oreothraupis arremonops
Yellow-throated chlorospingus, Chlorospingus flavigularis
Short-billed chlorospingus, Chlorospingus parvirostris
Ashy-throated chlorospingus, Chlorospingus canigularis
Common chlorospingus, Chlorospingus flavopectus
Tacarcuna chlorospingus, Chlorospingus tacarcunae
Dusky chlorospingus, Chlorospingus semifuscus
Grasshopper sparrow, Ammodramus savannarum
Grassland sparrow, Ammodramus humeralis
Yellow-browed sparrow, Ammodramus aurifrons
Black-striped sparrow, Arremonops conirostris
Tocuyo sparrow, Arremonops tocuyensis
Sierra Nevada brushfinch, Arremon basilicus (E)
Perija brushfinch, Arremon perijanus
Black-headed brushfinch, Arremon atricapillus
Gray-browed brushfinch, Arremon assimilis
Orange-billed sparrow, Arremon aurantiirostris
Golden-winged sparrow, Arremon schlegeli
Pectoral sparrow, Arremon taciturnus
Chestnut-capped brushfinch, Arremon brunneinucha
Sooty-faced finch, Arremon crassirostris
Olive finch, Arremon castaneiceps
Clay-colored sparrow, Spizella pallida (V)
Rufous-collared sparrow, Zonotrichia capensis
Lincoln's sparrow, Melospiza lincolnii (V)
Savannah sparrow, Passerculus sandwichensis (SA) (H)
White-naped brushfinch, Atlapetes albinucha
Moustached brushfinch, Atlapetes albofrenatus
Santa Marta brushfinch, Atlapetes melanocephalus (E)
Ochre-breasted brushfinch, Atlapetes semirufus
Yellow-headed brushfinch, Atlapetes flaviceps (E)
Dusky-headed brushfinch, Atlapetes fuscoolivaceus (E)
White-rimmed brushfinch, Atlapetes leucopis
Tricolored brushfinch, Atlapetes tricolor
Slaty brushfinch, Atlapetes schistaceus
Pale-naped brushfinch, Atlapetes pallidinucha
Antioquia brushfinch, Atlapetes blancae (E)  
Yellow-breasted brushfinch, Atlapetes latinuchus

Blackbirds
Order: PasseriformesFamily: Icteridae

The icterids are a group of small to medium-sized, often colorful, passerine birds restricted to the New World and include the grackles, New World blackbirds, and New World orioles. Most species have black as the predominant plumage color, often enlivened by yellow, orange, or red. Forty-one species have been recorded in Colombia; this is the greatest number of icterids in any country.

Bobolink, Dolichonyx oryzivorus
Eastern meadowlark, Sturnella magna
Red-breasted meadowlark, Leistes militaris
Peruvian meadowlark, Leistes bellicosa
Yellow-billed cacique, Amblycercus holosericeus
Russet-backed oropendola, Psarocolius angustifrons
Green oropendola, Psarocolius viridis
Chestnut-headed oropendola, Psarocolius wagleri
Crested oropendola, Psarocolius decumanus
Black oropendola, Psarocolius guatimozinus
Baudo oropendola, Psarocolius cassini (E)
Olive oropendola, Psarocolius bifasciatus
Solitary black cacique, Cacicus solitarius
Ecuadorian cacique, Cacicus sclateri
Scarlet-rumped cacique, Cacicus uropygialis
Yellow-rumped cacique, Cacicus cela
Mountain cacique, Cacicus chrysonotus
Band-tailed cacique, Cacicus latirostris
Red-rumped cacique, Cacicus haemorrhous
Casqued cacique, Cacicus oseryi
Venezuelan troupial, Icterus icterus
Orange-backed troupial, Icterus croconotus
Yellow-tailed oriole, Icterus mesomelas
Epaulet oriole, Icterus cayanensis
Orchard oriole, Icterus spurius
Orange-crowned oriole, Icterus auricapillus
Yellow-backed oriole, Icterus chrysater
Baltimore oriole, Icterus galbula
Yellow oriole, Icterus nigrogularis
Jamaican oriole, Icterus leucopteryx (SA)
Giant cowbird, Molothrus oryzivorus
Bronzed cowbird, Molothrus aeneus (see note)
Shiny cowbird, Molothrus bonariensis
Scrub blackbird, Dives warczewiczi
Carib grackle, Quiscalus lugubris
Great-tailed grackle, Quiscalus mexicanus
Velvet-fronted grackle, Lampropsar tanagrinus
Red-bellied grackle, Hypopyrrhus pyrohypogaster (E)
Oriole blackbird, Gymnomystax mexicanus
Mountain grackle, Macroagelaius subalaris (E)
Yellow-hooded blackbird, Chrysomus icterocephalus

Wood-warblers
Order: PasseriformesFamily: Parulidae

The wood-warblers are a group of small, often colorful, passerine birds restricted to the New World. Most are arboreal, but some are terrestrial. Most members of this family are insectivores. Fifty-six species have been recorded in Colombia.

Ovenbird, Seiurus aurocapilla
Worm-eating warbler, Helmitheros vermivorum
Louisiana waterthrush, Parkesia motacilla
Northern waterthrush, Parkesia noveboracensis
Golden-winged warbler, Vermivora chrysoptera
Blue-winged warbler, Vermivora cyanoptera
Black-and-white warbler, Mniotilta varia
Prothonotary warbler, Protonotaria citrea
Swainson's warbler, Limnothlypis swainsonii (SA)
Tennessee warbler, Oreothlypis peregrina
Nashville warbler, Oreothlypis ruficapilla (SA)
Connecticut warbler, Oporornis agilis
Masked yellowthroat, Geothlypis aequinoctialis
Mourning warbler, Geothlypis philadelphia
Kentucky warbler, Geothlypis formosa
Olive-crowned yellowthroat, Geothlypis semiflava
Common yellowthroat, Geothlypis trichas (V)
Hooded warbler, Setophaga citrina (V)
American redstart, Setophaga ruticilla
Cape May warbler, Setophaga tigrina (H)
Cerulean warbler, Setophaga cerulea
Northern parula, Setophaga americana
Tropical parula, Setophaga pitiayumi
Magnolia warbler, Setophaga magnolia (V)
Bay-breasted warbler, Setophaga castanea
Blackburnian warbler, Setophaga fusca
Yellow warbler, Setophaga petechia
Chestnut-sided warbler, Setophaga pensylvanica
Blackpoll warbler, Setophaga striata
Black-throated blue warbler, Setophaga caerulescens (V)
Palm warbler, Setophaga palmarum (H)
Pine warbler, Setophaga pinus (SA)
Yellow-rumped warbler, Setophaga coronata (V)
Yellow-throated warbler, Setophaga dominica (V)
Prairie warbler, Setophaga discolor (V)
Townsend's warbler, Setophaga townsendi (V)
Black-throated green warbler, Setophaga virens (V)
Citrine warbler, Myiothlypis luteoviridis
Santa Marta warbler, Myiothlypis basilica (E)
Flavescent warbler, Myiothlypis flaveola
Black-crested warbler, Myiothlypis nigrocristata
Buff-rumped warbler, Myiothlypis fulvicauda
Golden-bellied warbler, Myiothlypis chrysogaster
White-lored warbler, Myiothlypis conspicillata (E)
Gray-throated warbler, Myiothlypis cinereicollis
Russet-crowned warbler, Myiothlypis coronata
Rufous-capped warbler, Basileuterus rufifrons
Golden-crowned warbler, Basileuterus culicivorus
Pirre warbler, Basileuterus ignotus
Three-striped warbler, Basileuterus tristriatus
Canada warbler, Cardellina canadensis
Wilson's warbler, Cardellina pusilla (V)
Slate-throated redstart, Myioborus miniatus
Yellow-crowned redstart, Myioborus flavivertex (E)
Golden-fronted redstart, Myioborus ornatus
Spectacled redstart, Myioborus melanocephalus

Mitrospingids
Order: PasseriformesFamily: Mitrospingidae

Until 2017 the four species in this family were included in the family Thraupidae, the "true" tanagers.

Dusky-faced tanager, Mitrospingus cassinii

Cardinal grosbeaks
Order: PasseriformesFamily: Cardinalidae

The cardinals are a family of robust, seed-eating birds with strong bills. They are typically associated with open woodland. The sexes usually have distinct plumages. Twenty-six species have been recorded in Colombia.

Hepatic tanager, Piranga flava
Summer tanager, Piranga rubra
Scarlet tanager, Piranga olivacea
Red-hooded tanager, Piranga rubriceps
White-winged tanager, Piranga leucoptera
Red-crowned ant-tanager, Habia rubica
Red-throated ant-tanager, Habia fuscicauda
Sooty ant-tanager, Habia gutturalis (E)
Crested ant-tanager, Habia cristata (E)
Carmiol's tanager, Chlorothraupis carmioli
Lemon-spectacled tanager, Chlorothraupis olivacea
Ochre-breasted tanager, Chlorothraupis stolzmanni
Golden grosbeak, Pheucticus chrysogaster
Black-backed grosbeak, Pheucticus aureoventris
Rose-breasted grosbeak, Pheucticus ludovicianus
Rose-breasted chat, Granatellus pelzelni
Vermilion cardinal, Cardinalis phoeniceus
Yellow-green grosbeak, Caryothraustes canadensis
Blue seedeater, Amaurospiza concolor
Blue-black grosbeak, Cyanoloxia cyanoides
Amazonian grosbeak, Cyanoloxia rothschildii
Ultramarine grosbeak, Cyanoloxia brissonii
Blue grosbeak, Passerina caerulea (V)
Indigo bunting, Passerina cyanea (V)
Painted bunting, Passerina ciris (SA)
Dickcissel, Spiza americana

Tanagers
Order: PasseriformesFamily: Thraupidae

The tanagers are a large group of small to medium-sized passerine birds restricted to the New World, mainly in the tropics. Many species are brightly colored. As a family they are omnivorous, but individual species specialize in eating fruits, seeds, insects, or other types of food. Most have short, rounded wings. Colombia has the greatest diversity of tanagers of any country. One hundred seventy-two species have been recorded there.

Hooded tanager, Nemosia pileata
White-capped tanager, Sericossypha albocristata
Yellow-shouldered grosbeak, Parkerthraustes humeralis
Plushcap, Catamblyrhynchus diadema
Green honeycreeper, Chlorophanes spiza
Golden-collared honeycreeper, Iridophanes pulcherrimus
Black-and-yellow tanager, Chrysothlypis chrysomelas
Scarlet-and-white tanager, Chrysothlypis salmoni
Scarlet-browed tanager, Heterospingus xanthopygius
Guira tanager, Hemithraupis guira
Yellow-backed tanager, Hemithraupis flavicollis
Bicolored conebill, Conirostrum bicolor
Chestnut-vented conebill, Conirostrum speciosum
White-eared conebill, Conirostrum leucogenys
Giant conebill, Conirostrum binghami
Blue-backed conebill, Conirostrum sitticolor
Capped conebill, Conirostrum albifrons
Rufous-browed conebill, Conirostrum rufum
Cinereous conebill, Conirostrum cinereum
Stripe-tailed yellow-finch, Sicalis citrina
Orange-fronted yellow-finch, Sicalis columbiana
Saffron finch, Sicalis flaveola
Grassland yellow-finch, Sicalis luteola
Plumbeous sierra finch, Geospizopsis unicolor
Band-tailed seedeater, Catamenia analis
Plain-colored seedeater, Catamenia inornata
Paramo seedeater, Catamenia homochroa
Chestnut-bellied flowerpiercer, Diglossa gloriosissima (E)
Glossy flowerpiercer, Diglossa lafresnayii
Black flowerpiercer, Diglossa humeralis
Black-throated flowerpiercer, Diglossa brunneiventris
White-sided flowerpiercer, Diglossa albilatera
Indigo flowerpiercer, Diglossa indigotica
Rusty flowerpiercer, Diglossa sittoides
Deep-blue flowerpiercer, Diglossa glauca
Bluish flowerpiercer, Diglossa caerulescens
Masked flowerpiercer, Diglossa cyanea
Slaty finch, Haplospiza rustica
Blue-black grassquit, Volatinia jacarina
Black-and-white tanager, Conothraupis speculigera (V)
Rufous-crested tanager, Creurgops verticalis
Flame-crested tanager, Loriotus cristatus
White-shouldered tanager, Loriotus luctuosus
Fulvous-crested tanager, Tachyphonus surinamus
Tawny-crested tanager, Tachyphonus delatrii
White-lined tanager, Tachyphonus rufus
Red-shouldered tanager, Tachyphonus phoenicius
Gray-headed tanager, Eucometis penicillata
Pileated finch, Coryphospingus pileatus
Masked crimson tanager, Ramphocelus nigrogularis
Crimson-backed tanager, Ramphocelus dimidiatus
Silver-beaked tanager, Ramphocelus carbo
Flame-rumped tanager, Ramphocelus flammigerus
Fulvous shrike-tanager, Lanio fulvus
Crimson-breasted finch, Rhodospingus cruentus (H)
Short-billed honeycreeper, Cyanerpes nitidus
Shining honeycreeper, Cyanerpes lucidus
Purple honeycreeper, Cyanerpes caeruleus
Red-legged honeycreeper, Cyanerpes cyaneus
Swallow tanager, Tersina viridis
White-bellied dacnis, Dacnis albiventris
Black-faced dacnis, Dacnis lineata
Yellow-bellied dacnis, Dacnis flaviventer
Turquoise dacnis, Dacnis hartlaubi (E)
Scarlet-thighed dacnis, Dacnis venusta
Blue dacnis, Dacnis cayana
Viridian dacnis, Dacnis viguieri
Scarlet-breasted dacnis, Dacnis berlepschi
Lesson's seedeater, Sporophila bouvronides
Lined seedeater, Sporophila lineola
Chestnut-throated seedeater, Sporophila telasco
Chestnut-bellied seedeater, Sporophila castaneiventris
Ruddy-breasted seedeater, Sporophila minuta
Thick-billed seed-finch, Sporophila funerea
Chestnut-bellied seed-finch, Sporophila angolensis
Large-billed seed-finch, Sporophila crassirostris
Variable seedeater, Sporophila corvina
Gray seedeater, Sporophila intermedia
Wing-barred seedeater, Sporophila americana
White-naped seedeater, Sporophila fringilloides
Black-and-white seedeater, Sporophila luctuosa
Yellow-bellied seedeater, Sporophila nigricollis
Double-collared seedeater, Sporophila caerulescens
Slate-colored seedeater, Sporophila schistacea
Plumbeous seedeater, Sporophila plumbea
Buff-throated saltator, Saltator maximus
Black-winged saltator, Saltator atripennis
Orinocan saltator, Saltator orenocensis
Olive-gray saltator, Saltator olivascens
Bluish-gray saltator, Saltator coerulescens
Streaked saltator, Saltator striatipectus
Masked saltator, Saltator cinctus
Slate-colored grosbeak, Saltator grossus
Wedge-tailed grass-finch, Emberizoides herbicola
Black-headed hemispingus, Pseudospingus verticalis
Gray-hooded bush tanager, Cnemoscopus rubrirostris
Black-capped hemispingus, Kleinothraupis atropileus
Oleaginous hemispingus, Sphenopsis frontalis
Black-eared hemispingus, Sphenopsis melanotis
Orange-headed tanager, Thlypopsis sordida
Fulvous-headed tanager, Thlypopsis fulviceps
Superciliaried hemispingus, Thlypopsis superciliaris
Rufous-chested tanager, Thlypopsis ornata
Black-backed bush tanager, Urothraupis stolzmanni
Bananaquit, Coereba flaveola
Yellow-faced grassquit, Tiaris olivaceus
Dull-colored grassquit, Asemospiza obscura
Sooty grassquit, Asemospiza fuliginosa
Black-faced grassquit, Melanospiza bicolor
Glistening-green tanager, Chlorochrysa phoenicotis
Orange-eared tanager, Chlorochrysa calliparaea
Multicolored tanager, Chlorochrysa nitidissima (E)
Masked cardinal, Paroaria nigrogenis
Red-capped cardinal, Paroaria gularis
Black-faced tanager, Schistochlamys melanopis
Magpie tanager, Cissopis leverianus
Vermilion tanager, Calochaetes coccineus
Purplish-mantled tanager, Iridosornis porphyrocephalus
Yellow-throated tanager, Iridosornis analis
Golden-crowned tanager, Iridosornis rufivertex
Fawn-breasted tanager, Pipraeidea melanonota
Buff-breasted mountain tanager, Dubusia taeniata
Black-cheeked mountain tanager, Anisognathus melanogenys (E)
Lacrimose mountain tanager, Anisognathus lacrymosus
Scarlet-bellied mountain tanager, Anisognathus igniventris
Blue-winged mountain tanager, Anisognathus somptuosus
Black-chinned mountain tanager, Anisognathus notabilis
Hooded mountain tanager, Buthraupis montana
Masked mountain tanager, Tephrospilus wetmorei
Blue-capped tanager, Sporathraupis cyanocephala
Grass-green tanager, Chlorornis riefferii
Black-chested mountain tanager, Cnemathraupis eximia
Yellow-green tanager, Bangsia flavovirens
Blue-and-gold tanager, Bangsia arcaei
Black-and-gold tanager, Bangsia melanochlamys (E)
Golden-chested tanager, Bangsia rothschildi
Moss-backed tanager, Bangsia edwardsi
Gold-ringed tanager, Bangsia aureocincta (E)
Golden-naped tanager, Chalcothraupis ruficervix
Gray-and-gold tanager, Poecilostreptus palmeri
Black-headed tanager, Stilpnia cyanoptera
Black-capped tanager, Stilpnia heinei
Burnished-buff tanager, Stilpnia cayana
Scrub tanager, Stilpnia vitriolina
Masked tanager, Stilpnia nigrocincta
Golden-hooded tanager, Stilpnia larvata
Blue-necked tanager, Stilpnia cyanicollis
Blue-and-black tanager, Tangara vassorii
Beryl-spangled tanager, Tangara nigroviridis
Metallic-green tanager, Tangara labradorides
Blue-browed tanager, Tangara cyanotis
Plain-colored tanager, Tangara inornata
Turquoise tanager, Tangara mexicana
Paradise tanager, Tangara chilensis
Opal-rumped tanager, Tangara velia
Opal-crowned tanager, Tangara callophrys
Rufous-winged tanager, Tangara lavinia
Bay-headed tanager, Tangara gyrola
Golden-eared tanager, Tangara chrysotis
Saffron-crowned tanager, Tangara xanthocephala
Flame-faced tanager, Tangara parzudakii
Green-and-gold tanager, Tangara schrankii
Blue-whiskered tanager, Tangara johannae
Golden tanager, Tangara arthus
Emerald tanager, Tangara florida
Silver-throated tanager, Tangara icterocephala
Blue-gray tanager, Thraupis episcopus
Glaucous tanager, Thraupis glaucocolpa
Palm tanager, Thraupis palmarum
Rufous-throated tanager, Ixothraupis rufigula
Speckled tanager, Ixothraupis guttata
Yellow-bellied tanager, Ixothraupis xanthogastra
Spotted tanager, Ixothraupis punctata

Notes

References

See also
Endemic Birds of Colombia
List of birds
Lists of birds by region

External links 
Birds of Colombia - World Institute for Conservation and Environment

Colombia
 
Birds
Colombia